= Japanese immigration in Brazil =

Migration movement in the 20th century

Japanese Brazilians
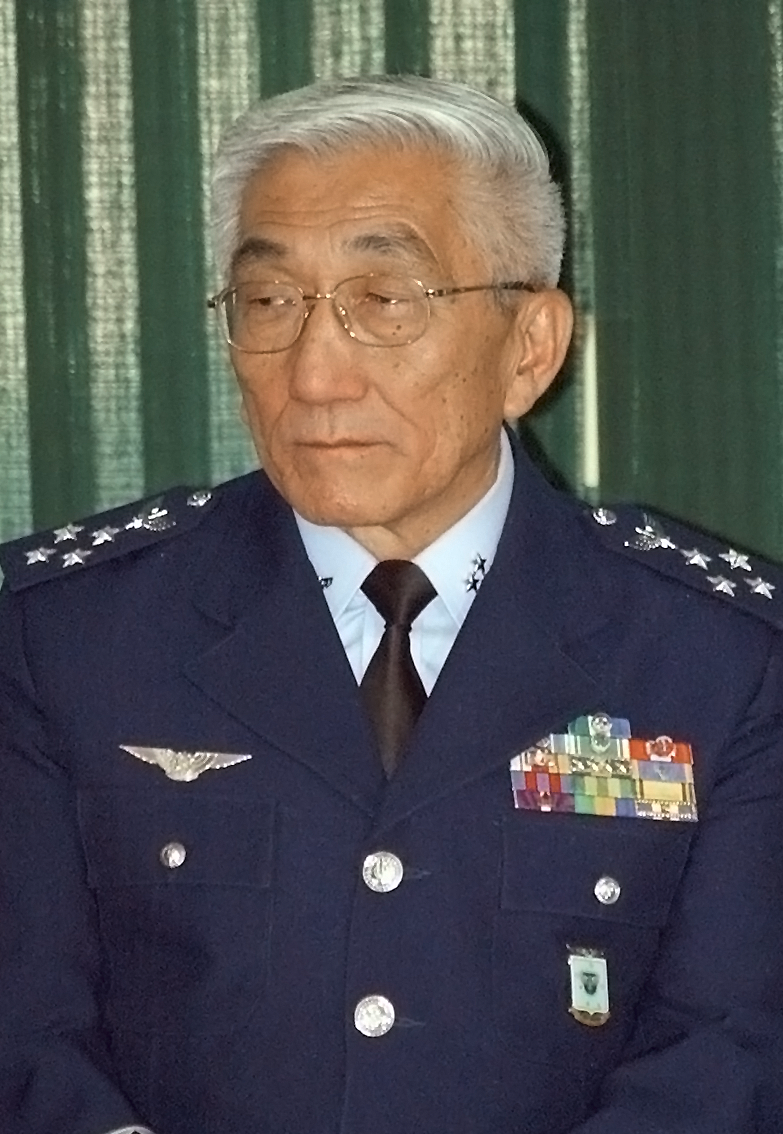
Juniti Saito

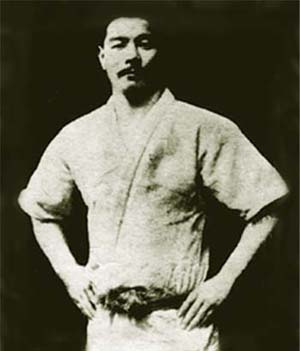
Mitsuyo Maeda

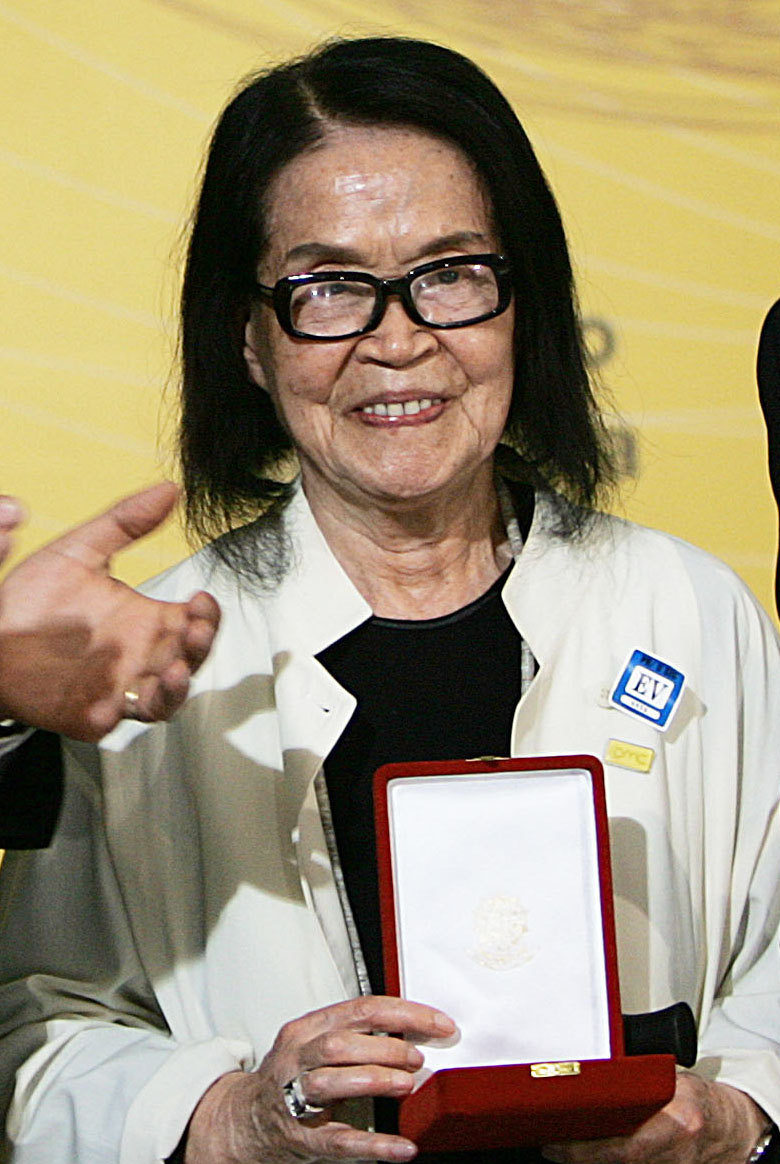
Tomie Ohtake

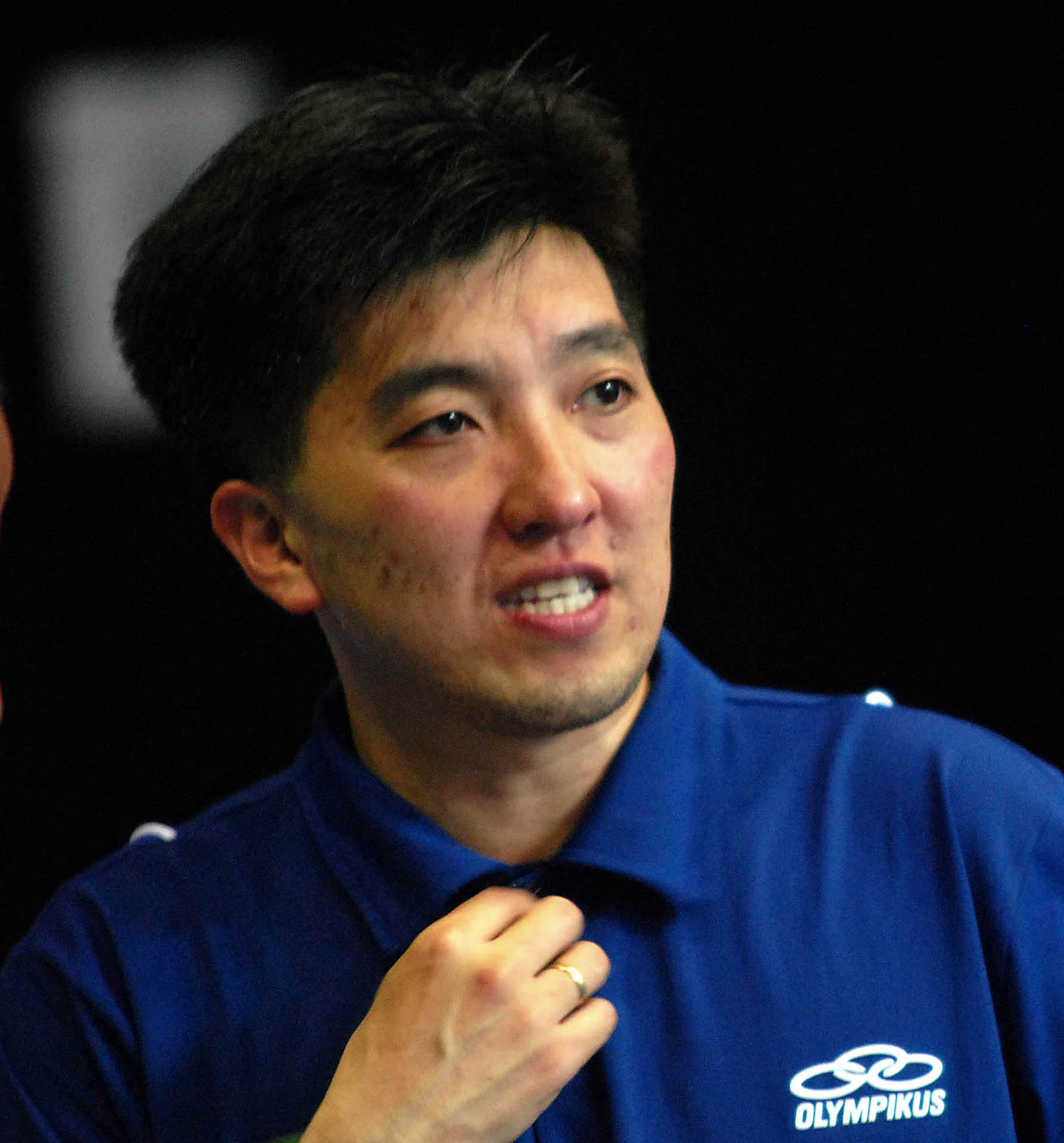
Hugo Hoyama

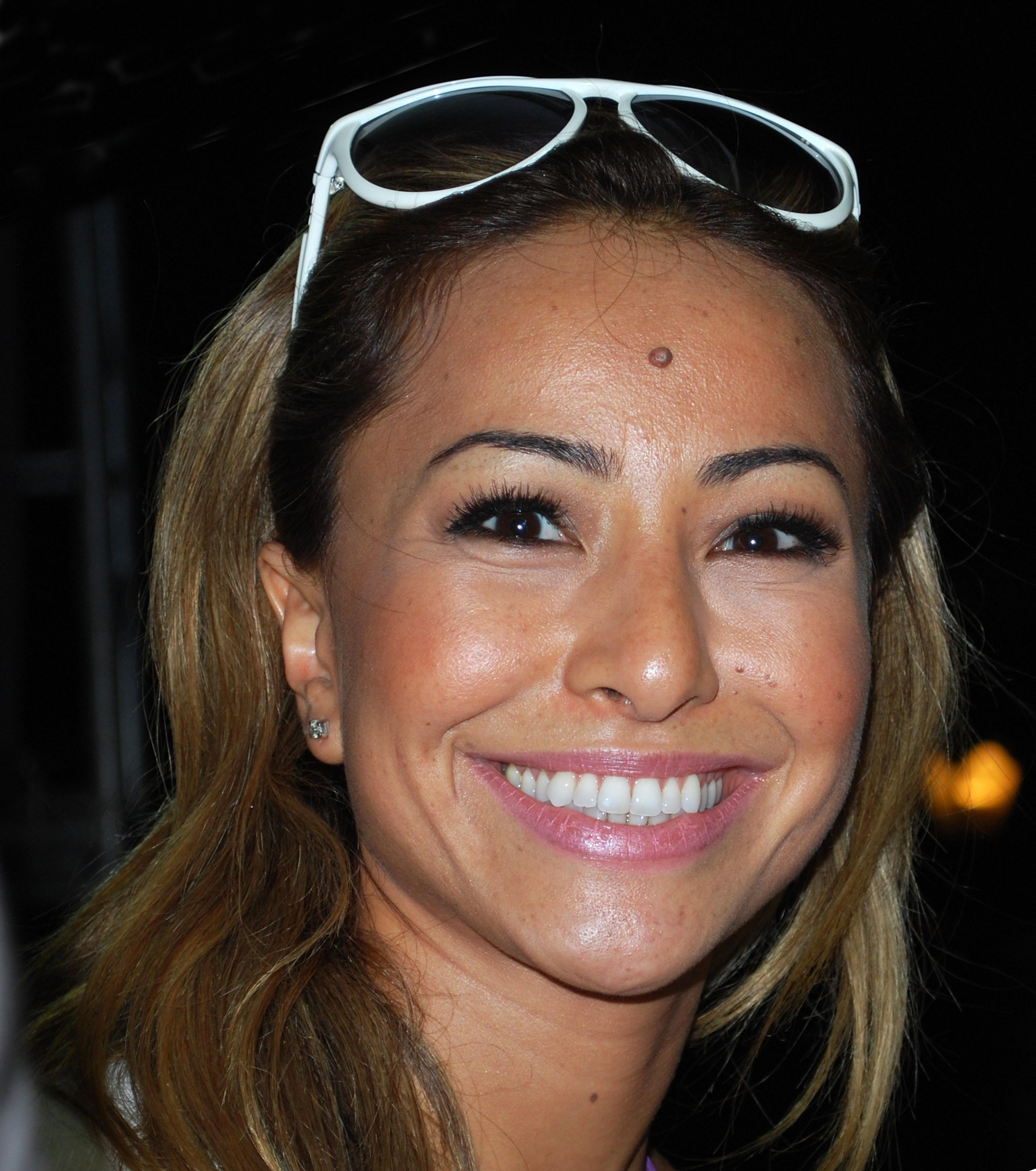
Sabrina Sato

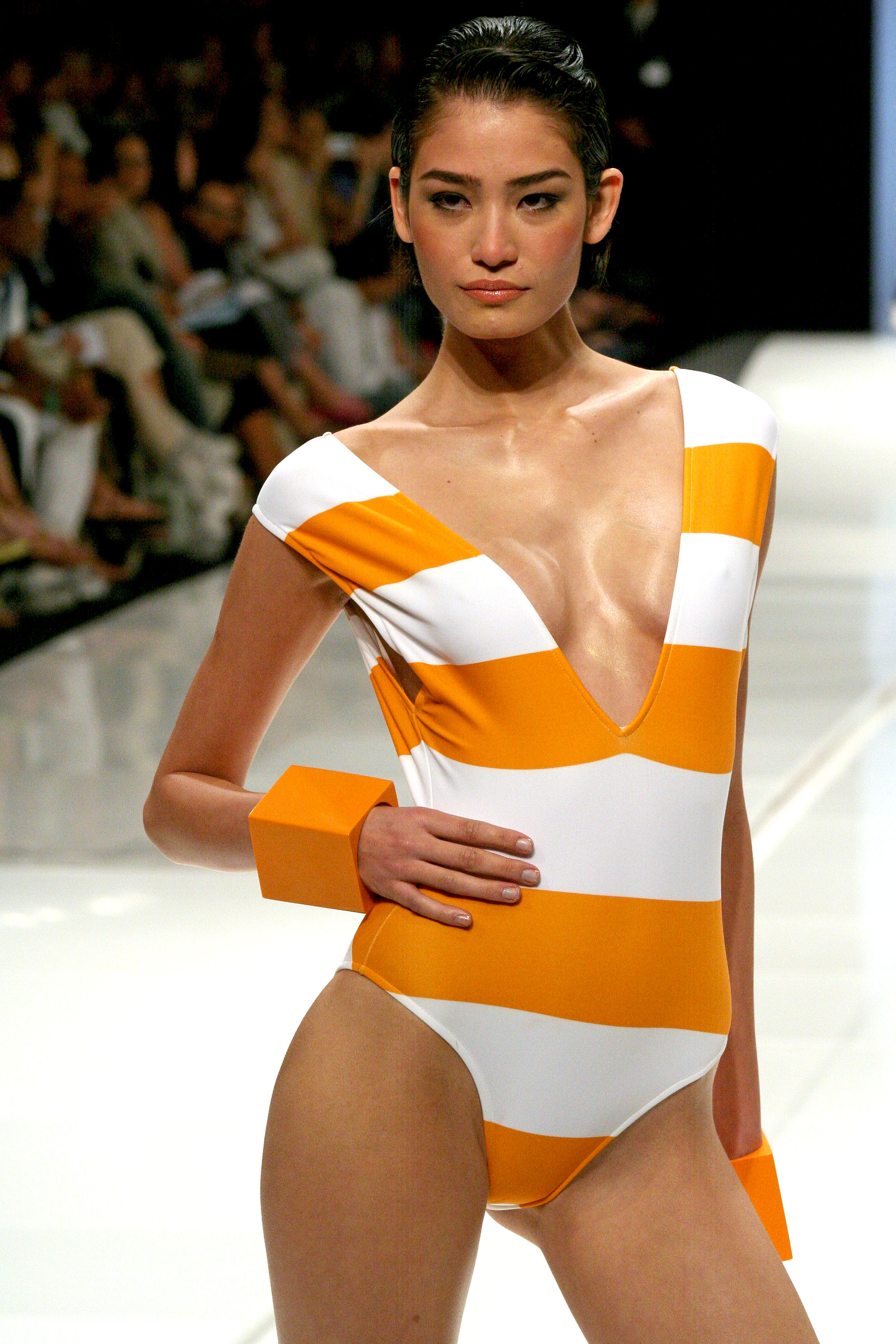
Juliana Imai

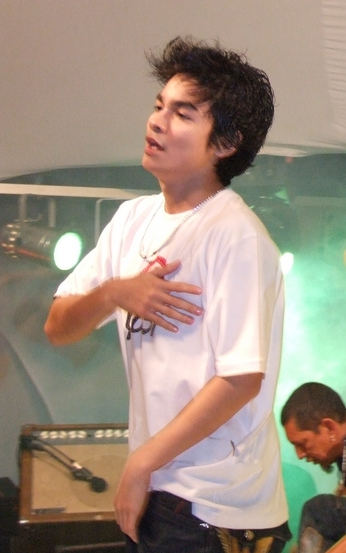
Yudi Tamashiro

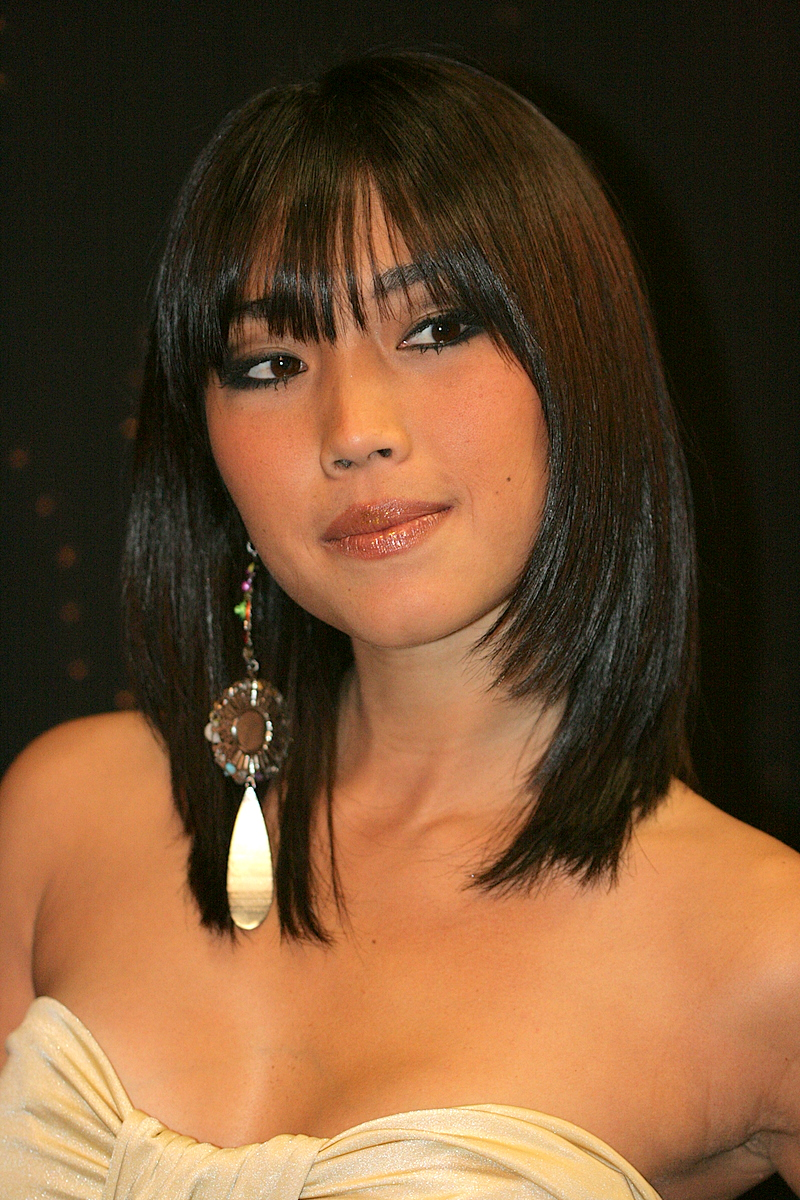
Daniele Suzuki

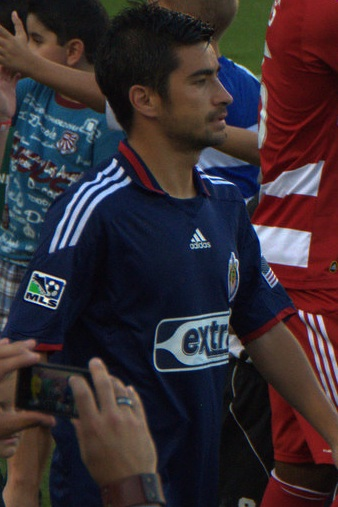
Paulo Nagamura

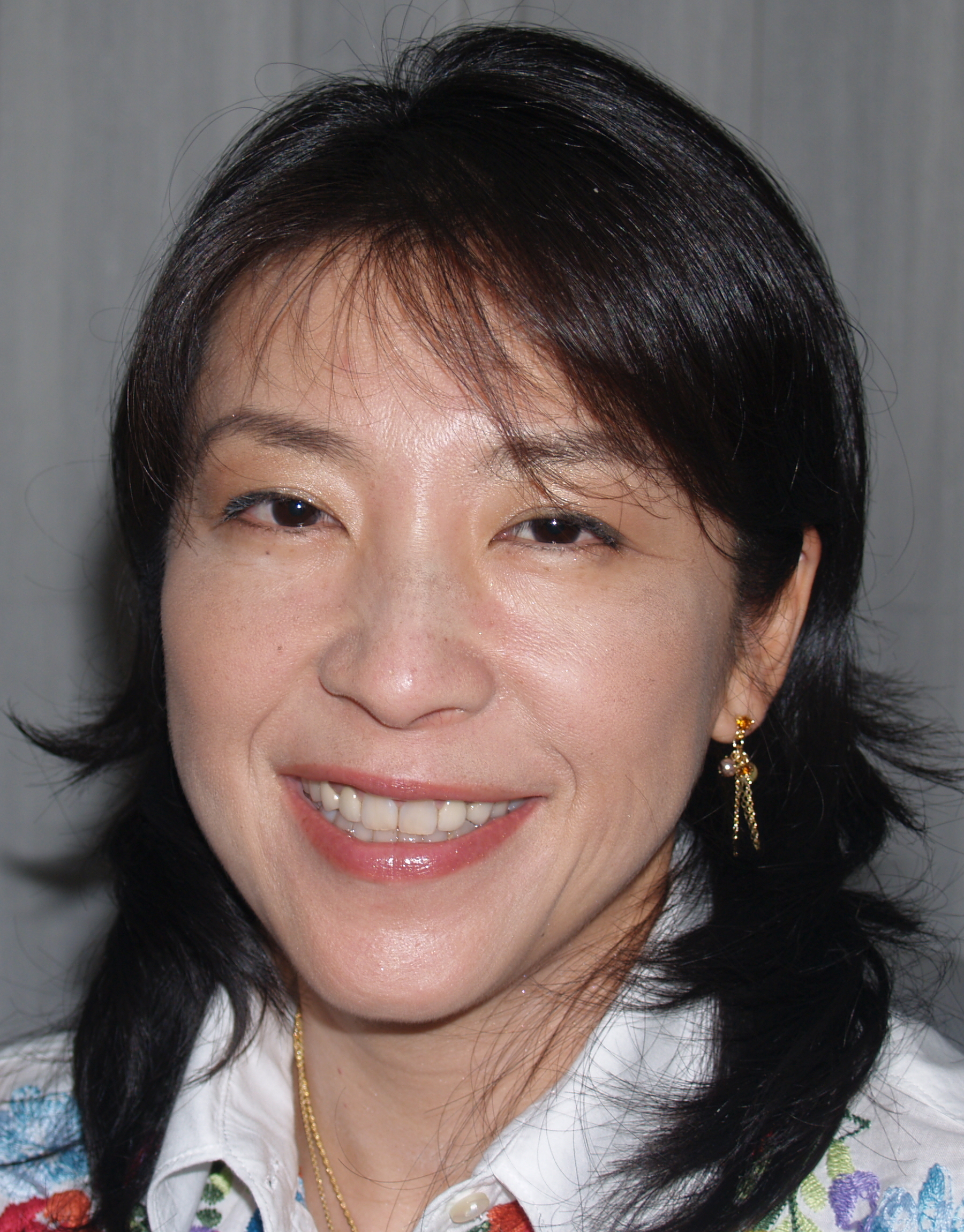
Lisa Ono

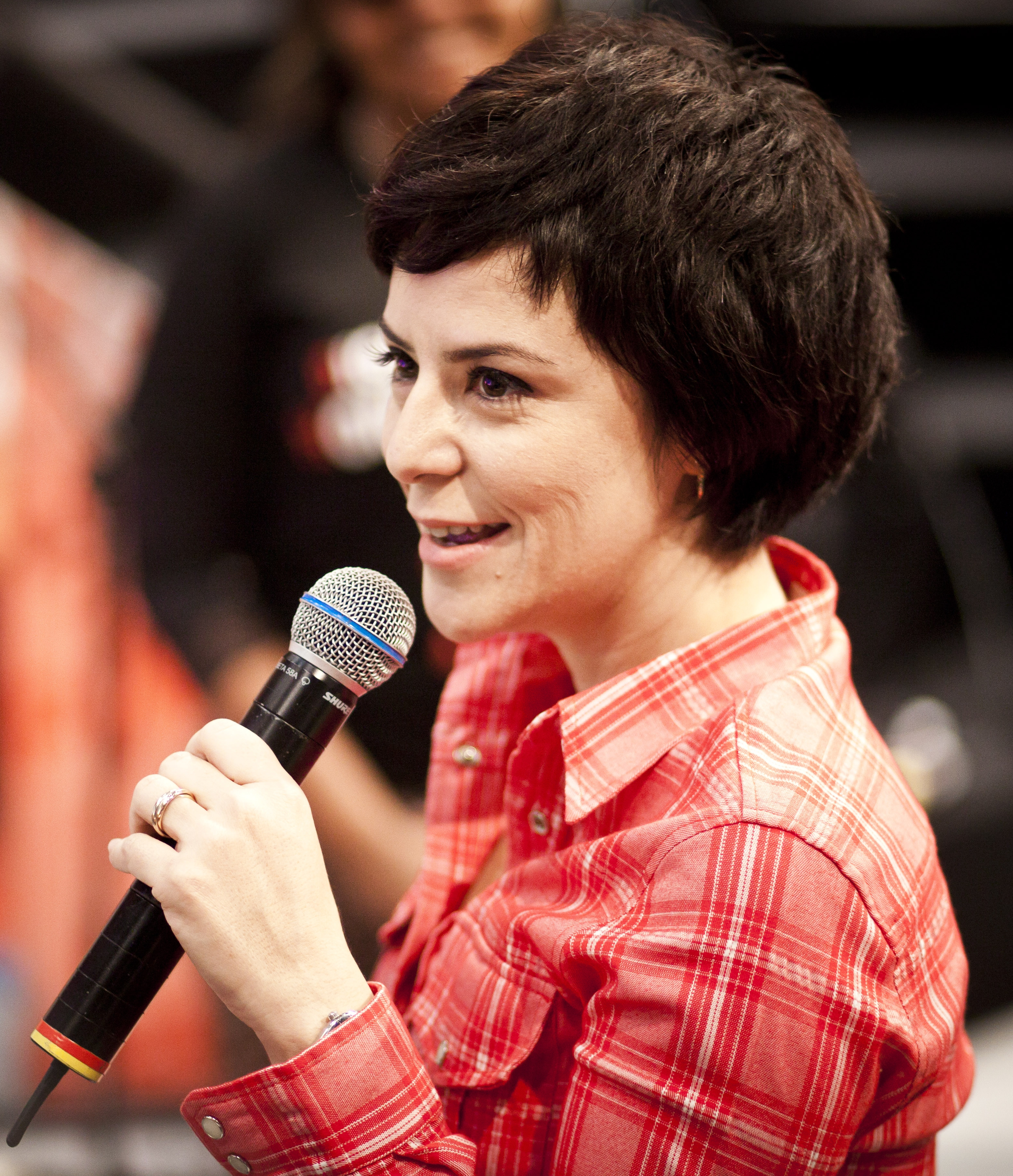
Fernanda Takai

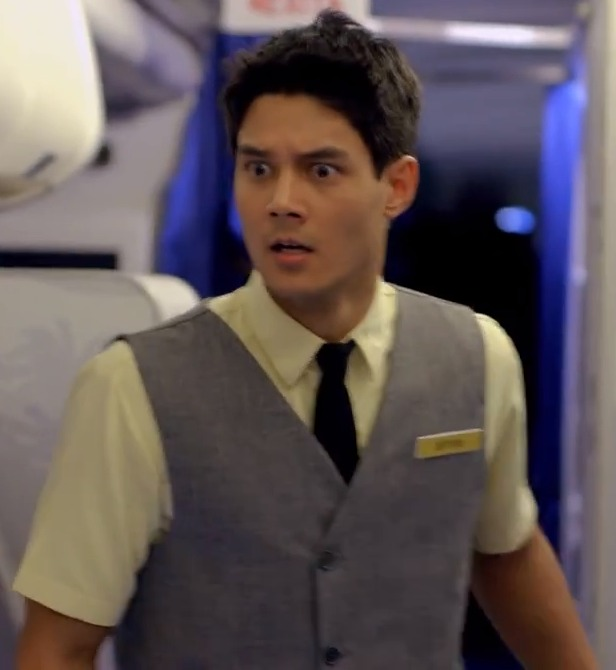
Daniel Matsunaga

Total population
- ~2.084 million descendants (1.09% of the Brazilian population)

Regions with significant populations
- São Paulo, Paraná and Mato Grosso do Sul. Distributed throughout the national territory through internal migrations.

Languages
- Portuguese, and a minority of descendants speak Japanese.

Religion
- Predominant Catholicism; A small proportion follow Buddhism and Shintoism

Japanese immigration in Brazil officially began in 1908. In 2022, Brazil is home to the largest population of Japanese origin outside Japan, with about 2 million Nikkei (日系), a term used to refer to Japanese and their descendants. A Japanese-Brazilian (Japanese: 日系ブラジル人, nikkei burajiru-jin) is a Brazilian citizen with Japanese ancestry. People born in Japan and living in Brazil are also considered Japanese-Brazilians.

This process began on June 18, 1908, when the ship Kasato Maru arrived in the country bringing 781 workers to farms in the interior of São Paulo. Consequently, June 18 was established as the national day of Japanese immigration. In 1973, the flow stopped almost completely after the Nippon Maru immigration ship arrived; at that time, there were almost 200,000 Japanese settled in the country.

Currently, there are approximately one million Japanese-Brazilians, mostly living in the states of São Paulo and Paraná. According to a 2016 survey published by IPEA, in a total of 46,801,772 Brazilians' names analyzed, 315,925 or 0.7% of them had the only or last name of Japanese origin.

The descendants of Japanese are called Nikkei, their children are Nisei, their grandchildren are Sansei, and their great-grandchildren are Yonsei. Japanese-Brazilians who moved to Japan in search of work and settled there from the late 1980s onwards are called dekasegi.

== History of Japanese immigrants ==
=== Need for emigration in Japan ===
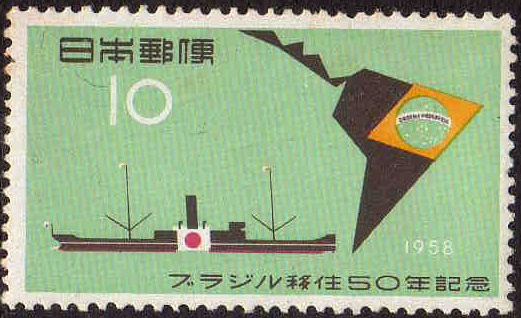
Japanese postage stamp in 1958.

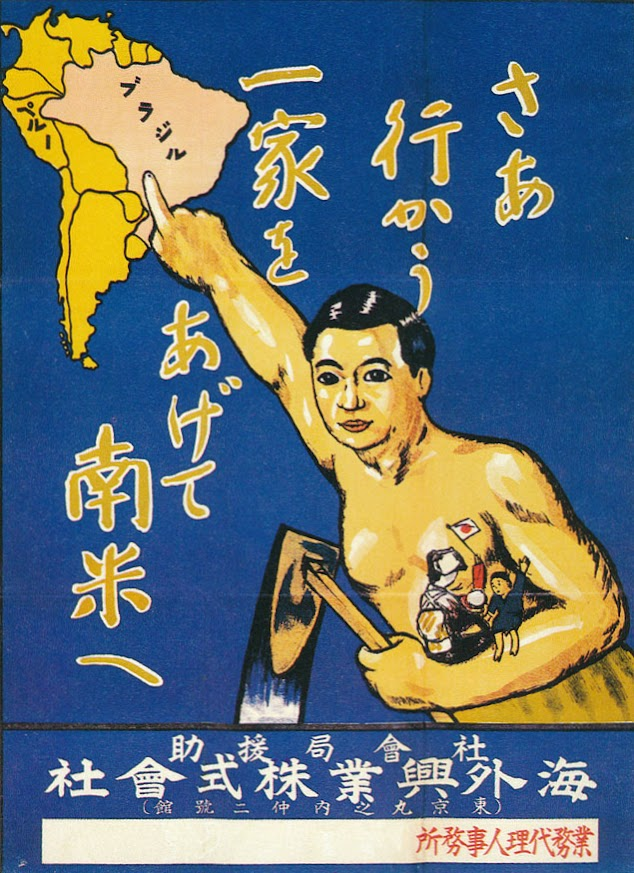
Poster advertising the immigration of Japanese to Brazil and Peru.

At the beginning of the 20th century, Japan was overpopulated. The country had been isolated from the world during the 265 years of the Edo period (Tokugawa shogunate), with no wars, epidemics from outside or emigration. Using the agricultural techniques of the time, Japan produced only as much food as it consumed, without storing enough for hard times. Any shortfall in the agricultural harvest caused widespread famine.

The end of the Tokugawa Shogunate allowed an intense project of modernization and expansion during the Meiji era. Despite land reform, the mechanization of agriculture left thousands of peasants unemployed, and thousands more had fallen into debt or lost their land because they could not pay the high taxes, which in the Meiji era were levied in cash, instead of being collected as part of agricultural production.

In the countryside, farmers who did not have their land confiscated for non-payment of taxes were barely able to support their families. Landless peasants moved to the main cities, which became crowded, and job opportunities became increasingly rare, forming a mass of miserable workers.

The emigration policy implemented by the Japanese government was mainly intended to relieve social tensions due to the scarcity of cultivable land and indebtedness of rural workers, allowing for the implementation of modernization projects.

From the 1880s, Japan encouraged the emigration of its inhabitants through contracts with other governments. Before Brazil, Japanese had already emigrated to the United States (mainly Hawaii), Peru and Mexico. The early 20th century also experienced large flows of Japanese emigration to colonize the newly conquered territories of Korea and Taiwan. Large colonies of Japanese descendants were formed only in Brazil, the United States and Peru, and almost all the immigrants who formed large colonies in Korea and Taiwan returned to Japan after the end of World War II.

In April 1905, Minister Fukashi Sugimura arrived in Brazil and visited several locations, being well received by both the local authorities and the people; part of this treatment is due to the Japanese victory in the Russo-Japanese War against the great Russian Empire. The report produced by Sugimura, which described the receptivity of Brazilians, increased Japan's interest in Brazil. Influenced by this report and also by the lectures given by Secretary Kumaichi Horiguchi, Japanese decided to travel to Brazil individually.

=== Need for immigration in Brazil ===
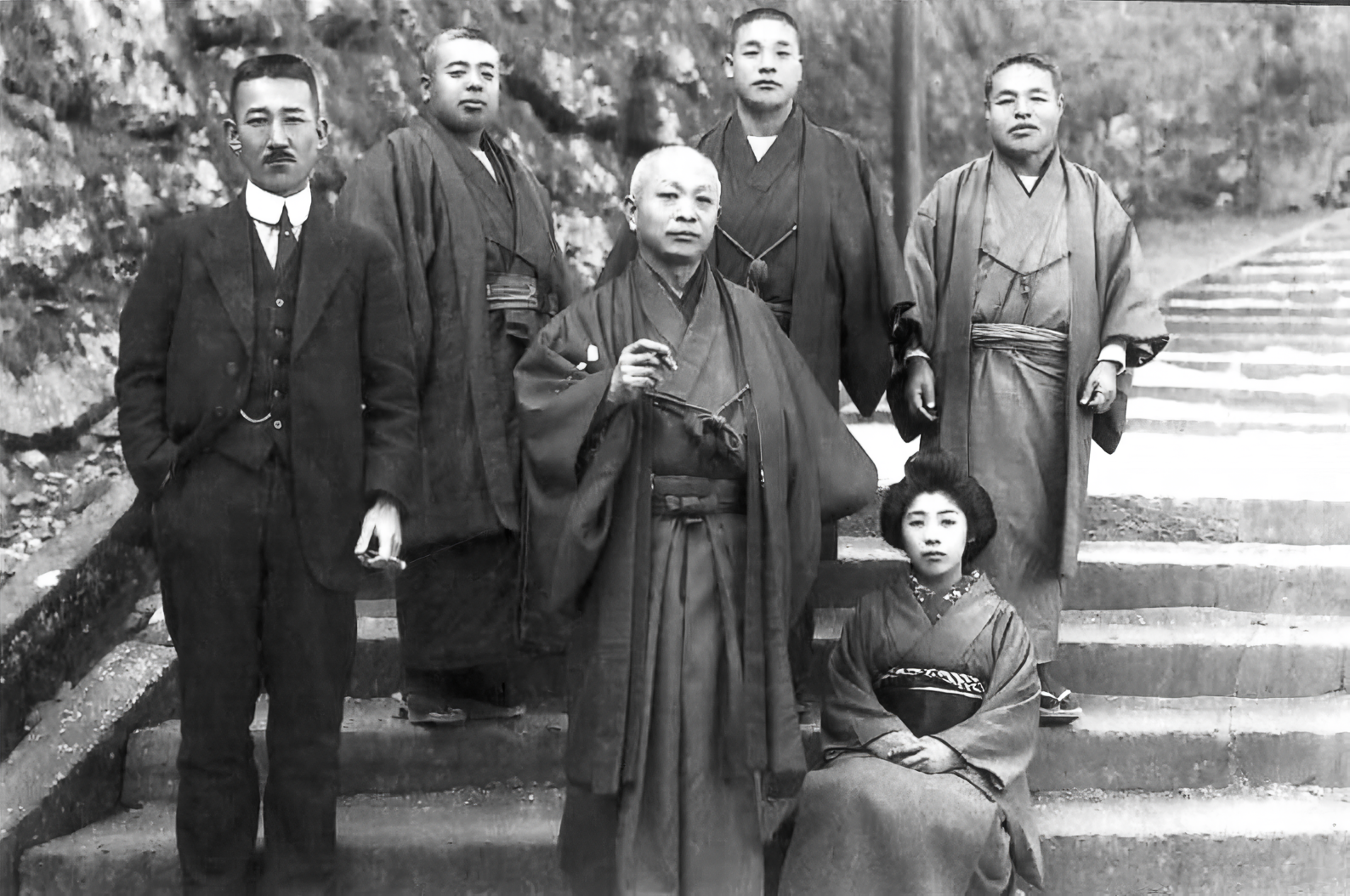
Ryo Mizuno (center), responsible for organizing the first trip of Japanese immigrants to Brazil.

Due to the expansion of coffee plantations, which was the major driver of the Brazilian economy from the second half of the 19th century until the 1920s, there was a demand for cheap workforce in rural São Paulo.

The first official visit to pursue a diplomatic trade agreement with Japan took place in 1880. On November 16 of that year, Vice Admiral Artur Silveira da Mota began negotiations in Tokyo to establish a Treaty of Friendship, Commerce and Navigation between the two countries. Mota was received by the Vice-Minister of Foreign Affairs, Kagenori Ueno. Efforts were renewed in 1882 with Minister Plenipotentiary Eduardo Calado, who accompanied Mota in 1880. However, the treaty would only be signed three years later, on November 5, 1895, by the Brazilian plenipotentiary minister Gabriel de Toledo Piza e Almeida and the Japanese plenipotentiary Minister Sone Arasuke, allowing the introduction of Japanese immigrants in Brazil.

Japan, which had only opened up to international trade in 1846, was considered very distant physically and politically from Brazil. The signing of this treaty represented the beginning of a relationship that has persisted to the present day, with the exception of the years of the World War II.

Before, the Brazilian immigration policy was executed not only as a means to colonize, but also to "civilize" and "whitewash" the country with European population. The immigration of Asians was practically prohibited in 1890. In that year, Decree No. 528 signed by President Deodoro da Fonseca and Minister of Agriculture Francisco Glicério determined that the entry of immigrants from Africa and Asia would be allowed only with the authorization of the National Congress. The same decree did not restrict, and even encouraged, the immigration of Europeans. It was only in 1892 that Law No. 97 was approved, allowing Chinese and Japanese immigrants to enter Brazil, and Decree No. 528 of 1890 lost its effect.

The prejudice against Asian immigrants was very strong. All Asians were considered inferior races that would harm the "whitewashing" that was taking place in Brazil with the arrival of European immigrants. There was also the fear of the "yellow peril", in other words, that large populations of Orientals would spread ethnically and culturally throughout the Americas. Fear of the "yellow peril" had been exacerbated by the militaristic expansionism of the Japanese empire which, seeking to conquer lands to colonize, defeated China in 1895 and Russia in 1905 (the third defeat of a European country against a non-European in modern times, the first being the Mongol invasion of Europe in 1241, and the second being Italy against Ethiopia in 1896). There was the feeling that the Japanese immigrant was an "unassimilable desired" due to his customs and religion. At that time, the Chinese were considered superior to the Japanese, but this view changed after the Japanese victory in the Russo-Japanese War.

From 1892, Senator Ubaldino do Amaral became one of the most prominent figures on the national political scene regarding his position against the entry of Asians into Brazil. This opinion was shared by Luís Delfino, Senator for Santa Catarina. In 1892, there were several debates in the Chamber of Deputies and the Senate on the possibility of Asians entering the country. The position defended by Ubaldino was widely publicized in the political space, since he had great prestige and even became vice-president of the House. However, on October 5, 1892, President Floriano Peixoto sanctioned Law No. 97, allowing Asian immigrants to enter Brazil.

Francisco José de Oliveira Viana, author of the classic book "Populações Meridionais do Brasil", published in 1918, and Nina Rodrigues, creator of Legal Medicine in Brazil, were the great ideologues of the "whitewashing" of the country. Oliveira Viana considered that "the Japanese [were] like sulphur: insoluble".

Despite the prejudice, interest in the workforce was very high and the arrival of a ship with Japanese immigrants began to be planned for 1897. However, due to a coffee overproduction crisis, international prices collapsed and the arrival of immigrants was discouraged. By 1901, international coffee prices had recovered and the Brazilian government considered receiving Japanese immigrants again. The chargé d'affaires of the first Brazilian diplomatic mission in Japan, Manuel de Oliveira Lima, was consulted and expressed his opposition to the project of receiving Japanese immigrants. He wrote to the Ministry of Foreign Affairs warning about the danger of Brazilians mixing with "inferior races".

In 1902, the Italian government banned subsidized emigration of Italians to Brazil. The coffee plantations faced a severe shortage of workers as the number of Italians decreased, which led the Brazilian government to accept the arrival of Japanese immigrants. In 1907, Brazil created the Immigration and Colonization Law, which regularized the entry of all immigrants and definitively ended the restrictions of Decree No. 528 of 1890.

In 1906, Ryo Mizuno, president of the Kokoku Shokumin Kaisha (Imperial Emigration Company), visited Brazil accompanied by Teijiro Suzuki. The timing was propitious, as the restriction of Japanese entry into the US and the restriction of Italian emigration to Brazil meant that the interests of both countries, Japan and Brazil, were aligned. The interest came mainly from São Paulo, since the state was looking for alternatives to Italian immigrants, pursuing the policy of wage depreciation by offering rural workers in quantities above demand. There was also an expectation that Japanese immigrants would resolve the tensions between employers and employees, a situation that had been worsening since the beginning of the century. After the government received favorable reports of the performance of Japanese immigrants in Hawaii, in which the superiority of the Japanese labor force compared to Europeans was praised, the São Paulo state government approved their entry.

The contract between Ryo Mizuno and the Secretary of Agriculture Affairs, Carlos José de Arruda Botelho, representing the São Paulo government, was signed on November 6, 1907. The document stipulated that 3,000 Japanese immigrants would be brought in annual batches of 1,000 people to work as farmers. On November 23, 1907, the newspaper A República published a note opposing the entry of the Japanese.

=== Pre-immigration ===
The first Japanese to land on Brazilian territory were four crew members of the ship Wakamiya-maru that sank off the Japanese coast in 1803, who were rescued by a Russian warship that took them on their journey. On the return trip, the ship docked for repairs in the Desterro Port, now Florianópolis, on December 20, and remained there until February 4, 1804. There, the four Japanese recorded the life of the local population and the agricultural production of the time.

When Law No. 97 became effective, in 1894, Japan sent Deputy Tadashi Nemoto to visit the states of Bahia, Rio de Janeiro, Minas Gerais and São Paulo. He was pleased with what he saw and made reports to the government and to the Japanese emigration companies in which he recommended Brazil for Japanese immigrants. The departure of the first batch of Japanese to work in the coffee plantations in 1897 was canceled the day before the shipment, due to the crisis that the price of the product suffered throughout the world, which would continue until 1906.

A significant group willing to establish a colony arrived in Brazil only in 1907. Led by Saburo Kumabe, who was a judge in Kagoshima, the group settled on the Santo Antônio farm, in the current municipality of Conceição de Macabu, then a district of Macaé, in the state of Rio de Janeiro. The colony produced milk and dairy products, as well as corn, beans and rice. The rice was planted in the numerous floodplains of the property, reaching two harvests per year. As time went by, the immigrants abandoned the project. Other Japanese were sent to the area by the Immigration Company, but they also abandoned the property. The colony ended in 1912 when Saburo Kumabe and his family left. There were several reasons for the failure of the colony, such as exhaustion of the soil, lack of investment, malaria epidemics and attacks by ants on the plantations. However, the main problem was that it was a heterogeneous group of people – lawyers, teachers, civil servants – without farmers with experience in cultivating the land.

=== Early days of official immigration ===
Officially, the Kasato Maru is considered the first ship to arrive in Brazil with Japanese immigrants. The 52-day voyage began in the port of Kobe and ended in the port of Santos on June 18, 1908. There were 781 people, 186 of whom were women, comprising 165 families. There were few women because most of the groups had a husband and wife at their core and the rest were made up of relatives or even acquaintances who were not family members. These immigrants went to work in the coffee plantations of western São Paulo. At that time, before embarking, everyone was forced to go through a process in which they took medical exams and had basic Portuguese lessons. Under normal conditions, the journey would take two months.

Front Page of the Passenger List of the Kasato Maru, which brought the first Japanese immigrants to Brazil, 1908. National Archives.

The reception was not particularly warm. Only one journalist praised the immigrants by saying that they were "clean", something not very common among Europeans at that time. The magazine O Malho in its December 5, 1908 issue published a cartoon of Japanese immigrants with the following caption: "The São Paulo government is stubborn. After the failure of the first Japanese immigration, it hired 3,000 yellow people. It insists on endowing Brazil with a race diametrically opposed to ours".

In the first group of immigrants in 1908, few were farmers, as reported by São Paulo State President Manuel Joaquim de Albuquerque Lins in his message to the São Paulo State Congress in 1909:

Japanese immigration does not seem to have produced the expected results. The first 781 immigrants, introduced under the contract of November 6, 1907, entered the Hospedaria in June of the following year; but, mostly single individuals and little accustomed to farming, they shied away from certain agricultural services, which they gradually abandoned. Only a few families made up of real farmers remained on the farms, who work very hard to the satisfaction of the farmers on whose properties they were located.

Only on June 28, 1910, another ship, the Ryojun Maru, arrived in Santos, bringing another 906 Japanese immigrants, constituting 247 families, divided between 518 men and 391 women, who were sent to work on 17 coffee farms in the State of São Paulo. Despite all this, Japanese immigration continued to grow. In 1914, when the São Paulo government stopped hiring immigrants, the Japanese population in Brazil was estimated at 10,000 people. By 1915, another 3,434 families (14,983 people) of Japanese immigrants had arrived in Brazil.

=== Difficulties of the early days ===
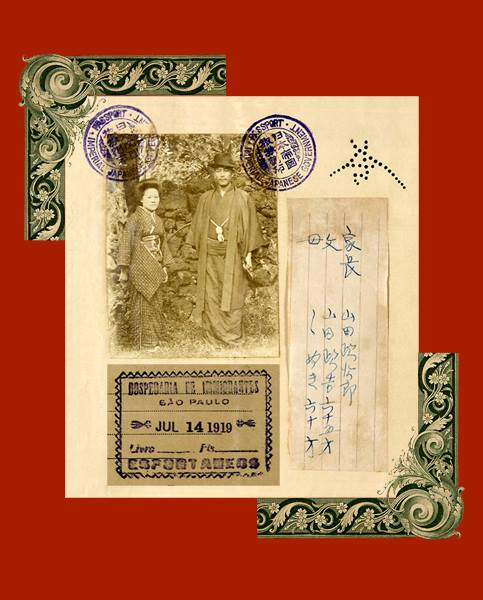
Passport photograph of Masataro Yamada and his wife, 1919. National Archives.

Japanese immigrants found it very difficult to adapt to Brazil. Language, eating habits, way of life and climate differences led to a strong culture shock. Most Japanese immigrants intended to get rich in Brazil and return to Japan after a few years. A considerable proportion never learned to speak Portuguese.

The Japanese expected to accumulate money quickly, but they received little, because their first payments were discounted from the installments of the debt for the trip, plus the expenses for food and medicine, usually bought on the farm itself. The contract stipulated that immigrants should stay on the farms for five years, but poor conditions led to many of them leaving the farms in the same year.

However, through a system called "partnership farming", the workers committed themselves to clear the land, sow the coffee, take care of the plantation and return the area seven years later, when the second harvest would be ready. In exchange, they kept everything they planted besides coffee, and the profits from the first harvest, considering that coffee is a biennial crop. This allowed many Japanese to save up and buy their first pieces of land. The first land purchase by Japanese in the interior of São Paulo took place in 1911. With their social rise and the arrival of relatives, most Japanese immigrants decided to stay in Brazil permanently.

Another factor that made it easier to stay in Brazil was that immigration contracts were made with families. Single Japanese could not immigrate alone, as was allowed with other ethnic groups. The common pattern was the immigration of Japanese families with young children or newly married couples.

The first generation born in Brazil lived similarly to their immigrant parents. Considering returning, the immigrants educated their children in Japanese schools founded by the community. The predominance of the rural environment facilitated such isolation. About 90% of the children of Japanese immigrants spoke only Japanese at home, and many Brazilians of Japanese origin in rural areas still have difficulty speaking Portuguese.

From 1912 onwards, groups of Japanese residents moved to the Conde de Sarzedas slope in São Paulo. In 1912, 92.6% of the Japanese were mainly engaged in coffee cultivation. The location was close to the city center and renting rooms or basements was the best the poor immigrants could afford. In the 1920s, Conde de Sarzedas Street was already known as the preferred place of residence for Japanese who were leaving the countryside. As the community grew, the surrounding Liberdade neighborhood became a Japanese neighborhood with typical stores and restaurants.

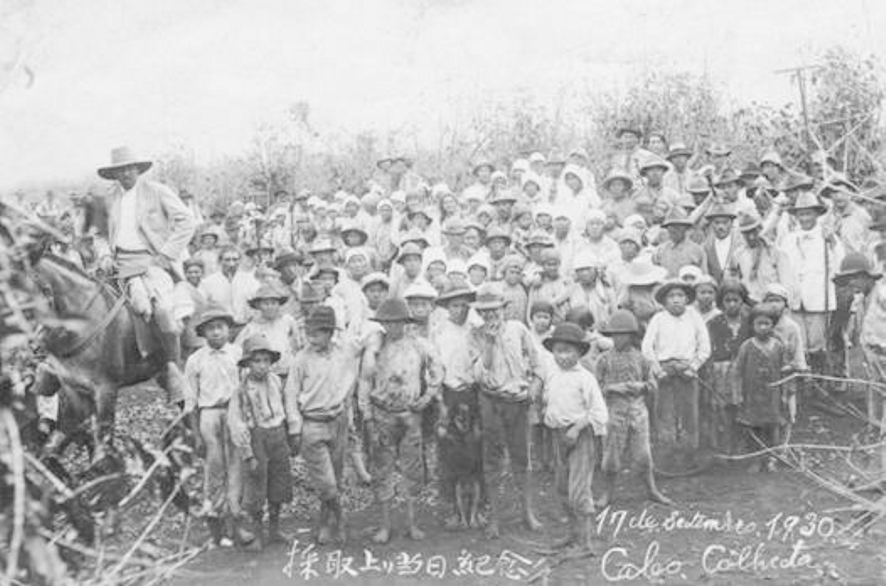
Japanese immigrants going to the coffee harvest, 1930s.

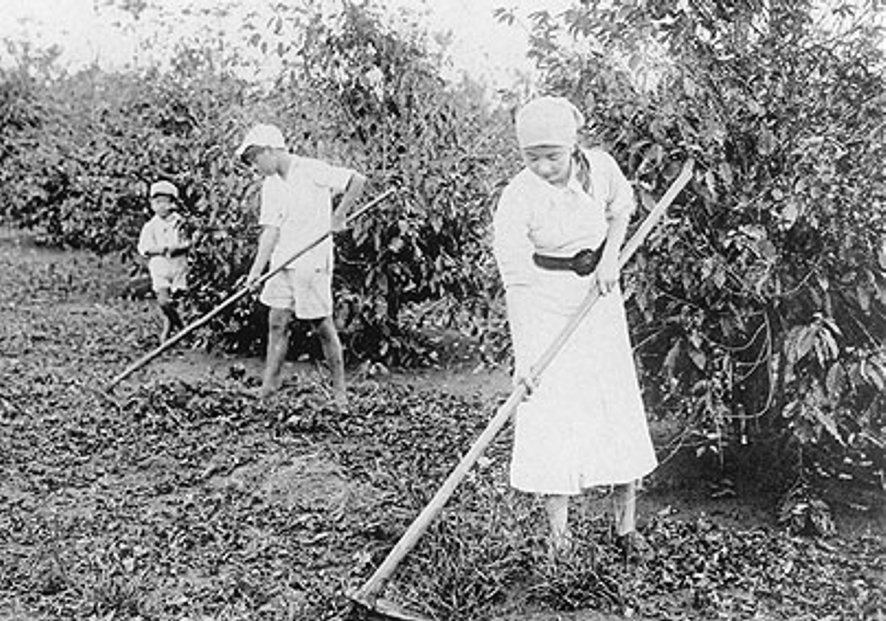
Japanese immigrants tending a coffee plantation.

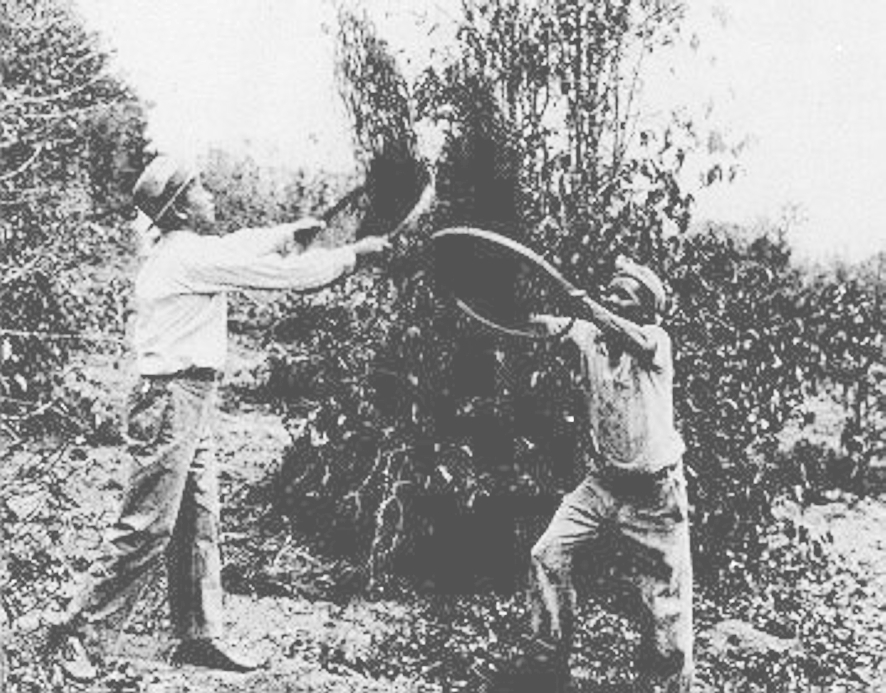
Japanese immigrants sifting coffee.

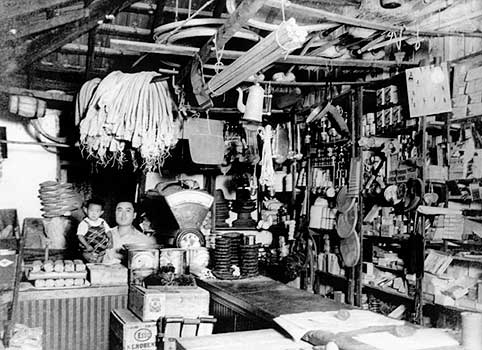
Japanese warehouse in São Paulo, 1940.

=== The great Japanese immigration ===
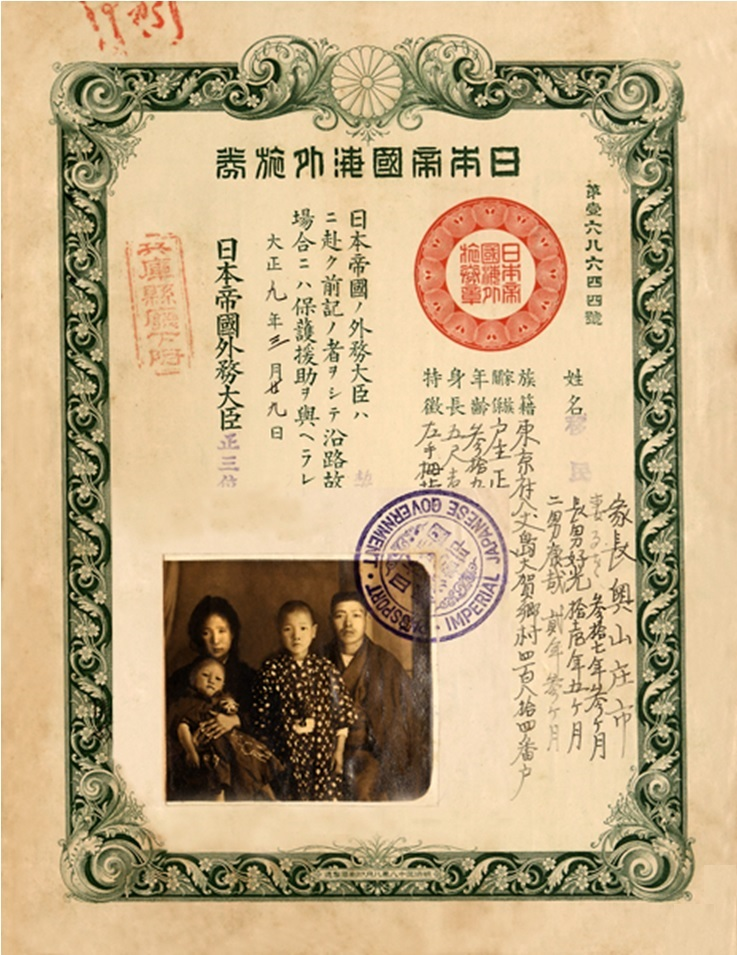
Japanese immigrant passport, 1921. National Archives.

With the end of the World War I, the flow of Japanese immigrants to Brazil increased enormously. Between 1917 and 1940, 164,000 Japanese arrived in Brazil, most of them in the 1920s–1930s. The presence of immigrants called kôtakusei, trained by the Kokushikan Kôtô Takushoku Gakkô (in Tokyo), an institution where they were prepared for about a year to come to Brazil, stood out from 1930 onwards. They were a different group who came with the intention of settling permanently, working and carrying out research.

The increase in immigration to Brazil was stimulated when the United States banned the entry of Japanese immigrants through the Immigration Act of 1924. Other factors for the growth of immigration were the advertisements of rapid enrichment in Brazil released by the government of Japan. Other countries, such as Australia and Canada, also placed restrictions on the entry of Japanese immigrants. Brazil became one of the few countries in the world to accept immigrants from Japan.

There were also bills to restrict the immigration of Japanese to Brazil. On October 22, 1923, Congressman Fidélis Reis presented a draft law to regulate the entry of immigrants with an article that said: "The entry of settlers of the black race into Brazil is prohibited and, as for the yellow race, it will be allowed, annually, in a number corresponding to 5% of the individuals existing in Brazil".

Japanese immigration, however, increased during the 1930s. About 75% of Japanese immigrants went to São Paulo, a state that had a great need for workforce in the coffee plantations. As new job fronts became available, Japanese immigrants also went to work growing strawberries, tea and rice. Small Japanese-Brazilian communities appeared in Pará with Japanese immigrants attracted by the cultivation of black pepper. By the 1930s, Brazil hosted the largest population of Japanese outside Japan. Many Japanese immigrants continued to arrive in this period, most of them attracted by their successful relatives who had already emigrated.

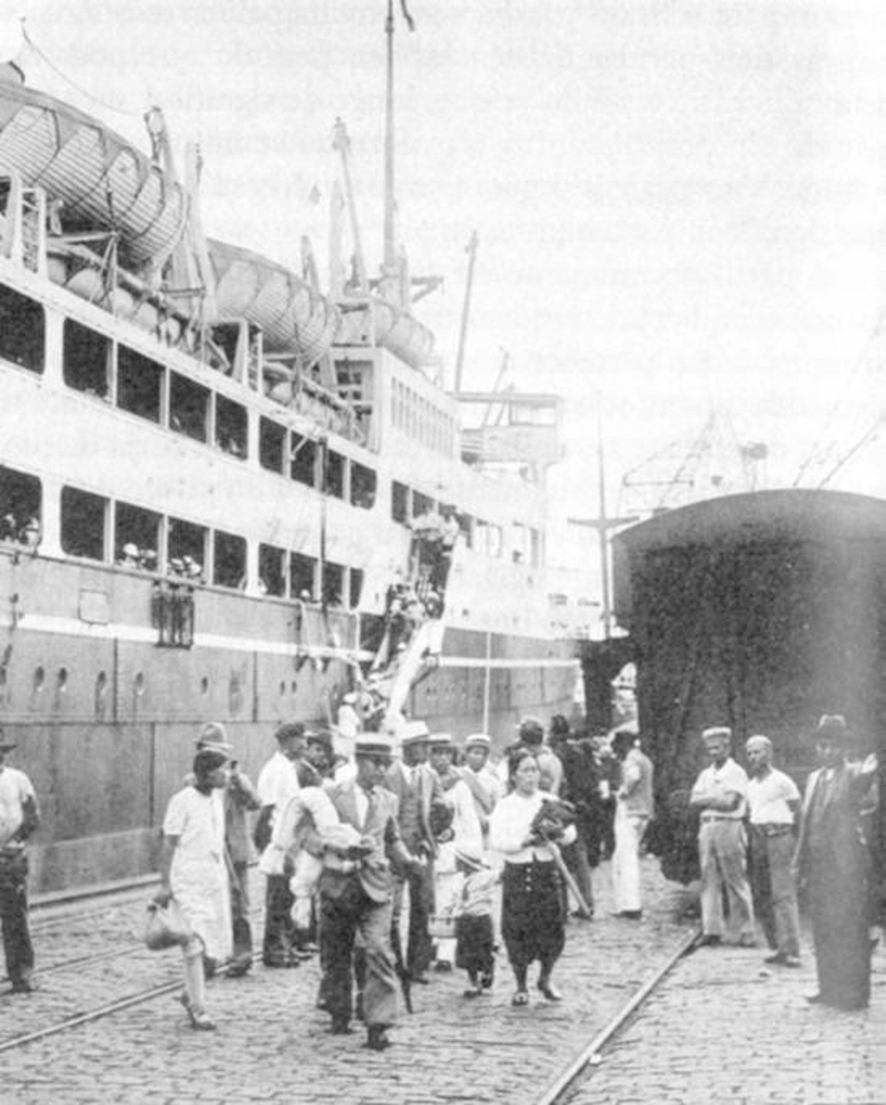
One of the last large arrivals of Japanese immigrants at the Port of Santos (year 1937 or 1938).

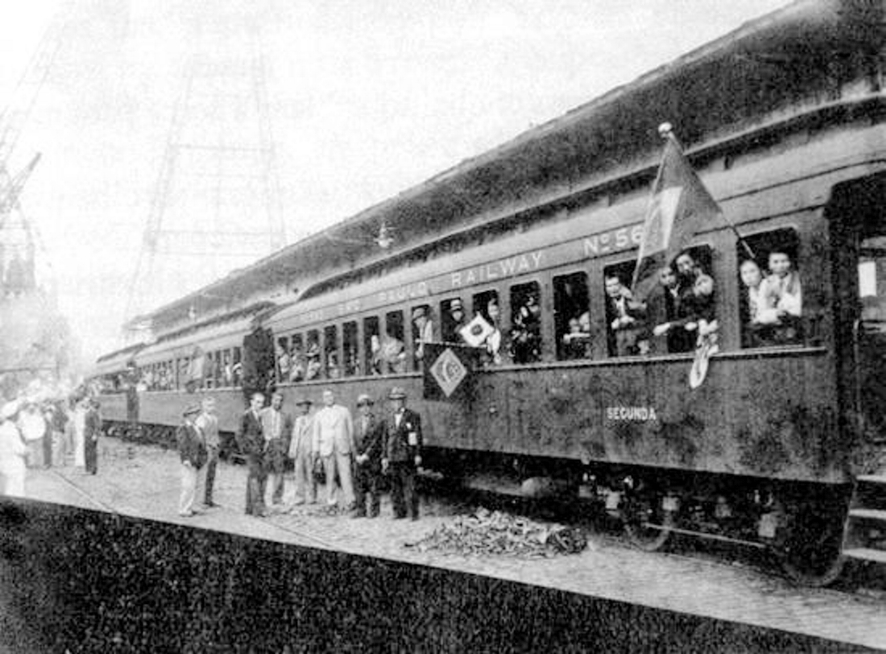
Train carrying Japanese immigrants from Santos to the city of São Paulo (1935).

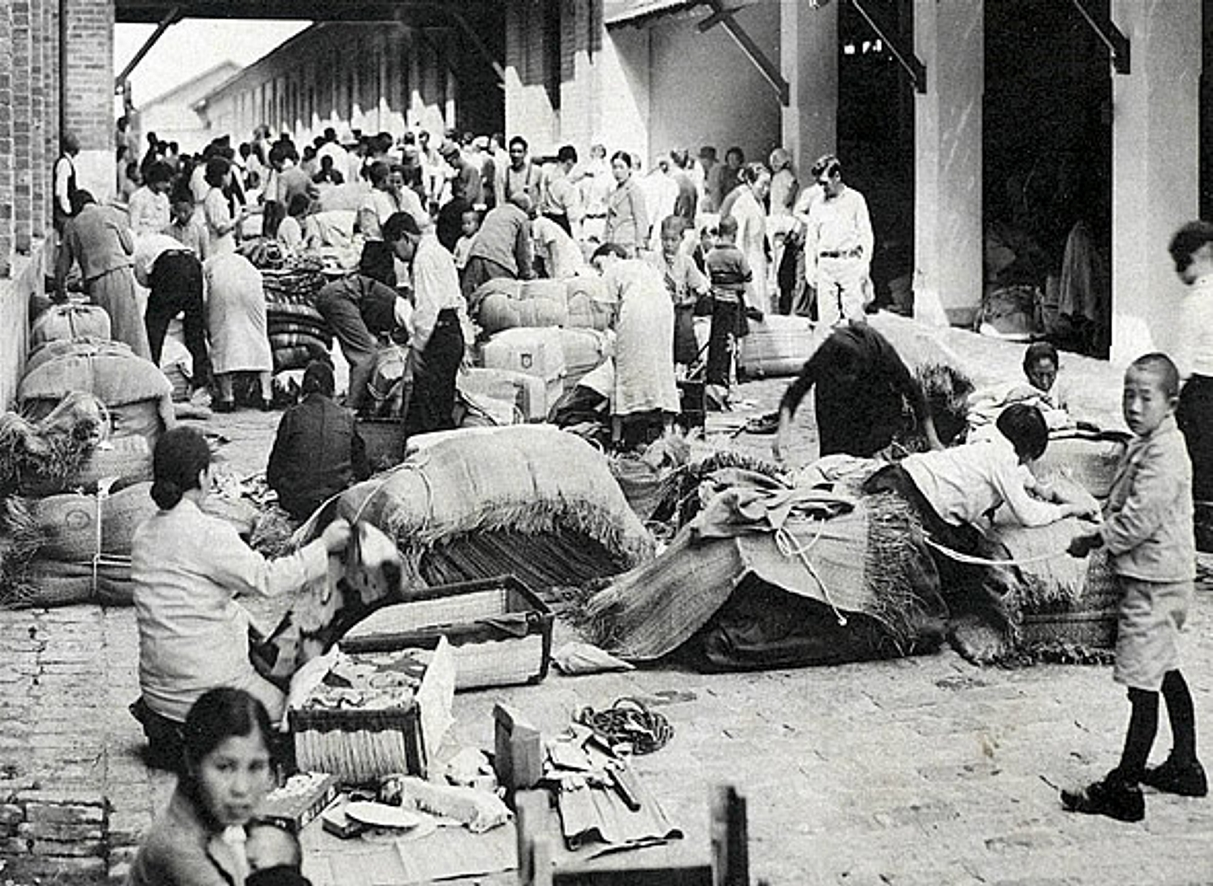
Japanese immigrants waiting for accommodation at the Hospedaria dos Imigrantes in São Paulo (circa 1935).

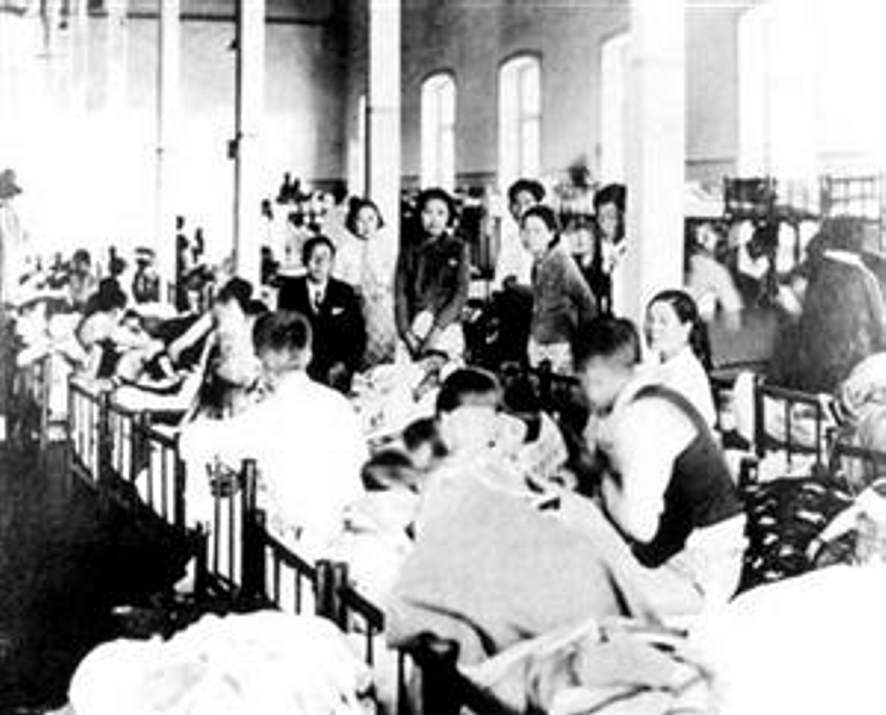
Japanese immigrants at the Hospedaria dos Imigrantes in São Paulo (circa 1935).

=== Nationalism in the Vargas era ===
The National Constituent Assembly of 1933 was the site of discussions of "scientific theses" of racial eugenics that proposed the need to "whitewashing" the Brazilian population. The great defender of these ideas was the doctor Miguel Couto (elected by the then Federal District) supported by other medical deputies such as the sanitarian Artur Neiva, from Bahia and Antônio Xavier de Oliveira, from Ceará. Together, they called for an end to the immigration of "aboriginal Japanese".

The consequence was the approval, by a large majority, of a constitutional amendment that established immigration quotas without mentioning race or nationality, and that prohibited the concentration of immigrant populations. According to the constitutional text, Brazil could only receive, per year, a maximum of 2% of the total number of entrants of each nationality that had been received in the last 50 years. Only the Portuguese were excluded from this law. These measures did not affect the immigration of Europeans such as Italians and Spaniards who had already entered in large numbers and whose migratory flow was descendant. However, the quota system, which was to remain in force until the 1980s, restricted the immigration of Japanese and, in the future, Koreans and Chinese.

In the 1930s, the issue of Japanese immigration was much debated, and the written material at the time was published in the most diverse ways, with thousands of pages of articles, advertisements and books on Japanese immigration. Those who opposed the entry of Japanese used essentially nationalistic arguments such as: "they [the Japanese] are stealing our jobs and our land", as well as racist, eugenicist statements such as "they will pollute our race". Those in favor of it tended to focus on production levels, with Japanese farmers producing 46% of Brazil's cotton, 57% of its silk and 75% of its tea in 1936. Other arguments given by proponents of Japanese immigration were the need for a larger workforce. One of the advocates of Japanese immigration, Alfredo Ellis Júnior, then a congressman, proposed that the quotas be circumvented by the use of so-called "call letters", which would allow both Brazilian citizens and immigrants with permanent residence in Brazil to "call" their relatives and these could immigrate to Brazil. In a speech to the Legislative Assembly of São Paulo, Bento de Abreu Sampaio Vidal, president of the Brazilian Rural Society, spoke of defending the Brazilian "race" from undesirable immigrants, but did not place the Japanese in this category. In a speech, he said:

I know like no one else the value of the Japanese. Marília, my beloved city, is the largest center of Japanese in Brazil. They are the most efficient people for the job, educated, cultured, sober.... During the dark night when the farmers could not pay their settlers regularly, not a Japanese settler was seen impatient or complaining. As for race, I don't know if the great doctors (the anti-Japanese doctors Neiva and Couto) are right, because in Marília there are handsome and robust men and women among the settlers.

The Estado Novo dictatorship implemented by Getúlio Vargas in 1937 sought to emphasize Brazilian nationalism by repressing the culture of immigrants who formed closed communities such as the Japanese and Germans. It also declared the confiscation of immigrants' property. In the following decades after World War II, several decrees were issued determining conditions for the return of what was confiscated, but currently the assets and shares remain in the custody of Banco do Brasil, and the institution and the National Treasury Secretariat admit the existence of this wealth, but do not officially comment on the fact.

Decree No. 383 of April 18, 1938 imposed several prohibitions on foreigners: they could not participate in political activities, form any kind of association, speak foreign languages in public or use them as a language of literacy for children; for most Japanese in the country, this was the only way to communicate. In the same year, the government ordered the closure of the nihongakus, which were the schools where the children of immigrants learned not only to read and write in Japanese, but to be and act as Japanese.

The broadcasting of radio programs in foreign languages was banned. Printed publications (newspapers, magazines, books) in foreign languages were also banned, unless they were bilingual; as this format was too expensive, newspapers and magazines ceased to circulate. In 1939, a survey by the Estrada de Ferro Noroeste do Brasil in São Paulo showed that 87.7% of Japanese-Brazilians subscribed to Japanese-language newspapers, a very high rate considering that a large part of the Brazilian population was illiterate and lived in rural areas. Decree No. 383 of 1938 practically ended the dissemination of information in the Japanese community, since much of it did not even understand the Portuguese language.

From then on, the entry of Japanese immigrants became increasingly difficult. The Minister of Justice Francisco Campos, in 1941, defended the prohibition of the arrival of 400 Japanese immigrants in São Paulo by writing:

Their despicable standard of living represents brutal competition with the country's workers; their selfishness, their bad faith, their refractory character, make them a huge ethnic and cultural cyst located in the richest of Brazil's regions.

=== World War II ===
The second generation of Japanese in Brazil definitely gave up on returning to Japan, especially when the outbreak of World War II made it impossible to leave the country. In 1941, the government ordered the community's newspapers closed (at that time, the news the immigrants had was that Japan had an advantage in the war). Back then, citizens of German, Italian and Japanese origin were considered "subjects of the Axis". From 1942, the government of Getúlio Vargas officially supported the United States in the war, making these inhabitants seen as "enemies" in Brazilian territory.

The 1940s was the worst decade for the Japanese-Brazilian community, as the Nikkei suffered repression from the authorities and derision from the population. The families of Japanese immigrants suffered from looting by the population, in which their belongings were stolen or destroyed by the people. These acts usually took place in the homes or businesses of these immigrants, and often the places were broken and set on fire. Participants in these actions shouted "death to the fifth column", a pejorative term used by the population to refer to the Nikkei. In rural areas, looting and destruction occurred and animals were frequently killed.

Before going to war, the Brazilian government took measures that affected the Japanese-Brazilian community. When Brazilian ships were torpedoed by German submarines, the Liberdade neighborhood already had the largest population of Japanese-Brazilians in the city of São Paulo. A few days later, on the night of February 2, 1942, police agents from DEOPS – the State Department of Public and Social Order, woke up the descendants living on Conde de Sarzedas Street and Students Street and, without any court order, warned them that they would have to leave the area within 12 hours. With nowhere to go, most stayed. However, the same was repeated on the night of September 6, when a ten-day deadline was given for the Japanese-Brazilians to move out of the area permanently.

The Japanese-Brazilian community was hit hard by restrictive measures when Brazil declared war on Japan in August 1942. In the same year, the percentage of Japanese-Brazilians engaged in coffee cultivation decreased compared to 1912, representing 24.3%, with an increase in those engaged in cotton cultivation, representing 39.2% of the total number of Japanese-Brazilians and an increase in so-called suburban crops, such as vegetables, fruits and poultry, representing 19.9%.

Japanese-Brazilians could not travel through the national territory without a pass issued by a police authority; more than 200 schools in the Japanese community were closed; radio sets were seized so that shortwave transmissions from Japan could not be heard. Japanese-Brazilians were prohibited from driving motor vehicles, even if they were cabs, buses or trucks owned by them. Drivers hired by Japanese-Brazilians had to have a police permit.

The assets of Japanese companies were confiscated and several Japanese-Brazilian companies were intervened, including the newly founded Banco América do Sul, which played an important role for the Nikkei, as it was where most immigrants invested the money from crops and commerce in the cities. However, during the war period, Banco do Brasil sent intervenors to take Banco América do Sul from the hands of the Japanese, leading to the dismissal of employees of Japanese origin who were replaced by Brazilian employees without any Japanese ancestry and most without banking experience; consequently, the bank entered into an administrative crisis. The situation only normalized years after the war, with the purchase of the bank by its former owners, once the institution was nationalized.

Immigrants and descendants of Italians and Germans suffered different forms of discrimination, official or not, during the World War II, but the feeling was stronger against the Japanese-Brazilians. Anonymous reports of activities "against national security" arose from disagreements between neighbors, debt collection and even children's fights. Thousands of Japanese immigrants were expelled from Brazil on suspicion of espionage, and even arrested for suspicious activities when they gathered. In December 1942, the journalist Hideo Onaga and some companions were arrested at a picnic because they were suspected of building a submarine.

At the time of the World War II, the term "concentration camp" was used for the prisons that housed the persecuted. The expression is different compared to the German concentration camps, where torture and death took place. In Brazil, there were several "concentration camps", which were aimed at German, Italian and Japanese immigrants. Overall, during the war, the Brazilian government created 31 concentration camps.

The fear of contact between immigrants and enemy submarines was exacerbated. On July 10, 1943, about 10,000 Japanese and German immigrants living in Santos were forced to close their homes and businesses and move away from the Brazilian coast within 24 hours. The police acted without any prior warning. About 90% of the displaced people were Japanese-Brazilians, leaving only those with Brazilian citizenship, but many also had to move to accompany their parents or spouses. This decision was made by the government due to unfounded rumors about immigrants disguised as fishermen to supposedly provide information to German submarines that were infesting the Brazilian coast. Even the sick patients were forced to move, being carried in hammocks. After the eviction, the abandoned houses were invaded by strangers. The Santos newspaper A Tribuna reported on the situation of those trying to dispose of their belongings: "In Marapé, Ponta da Praia and Santa Maria, there was a real rush to sell pigs, chickens, mules, etc. Many farm owners put almost everything they owned up for sale. They sold at any price, because there was no time to haggle". To live in the Baixada Santista, the Japanese had to have a pass granted at the discretion of the police authorities.

No suspicion of activities by Japanese-Brazilians against "national security" was ever confirmed. Despite this, in 1942, the Japanese colony that introduced pepper cultivation in Tomé-Açu, Pará, was practically transformed into a "concentration camp" from which no Japanese-Brazilians could leave. At this time, the Brazilian ambassador in Washington, Carlos Martins Pereira e Sousa, encouraged the Brazilian government to transfer all Japanese-Brazilians to "internment camps" without the need for legal support, just as had been done with Nikkei living in the United States.

Popular irreverence was encouraged with Carnival marches that mocked Emperor Hirohito and the "land of the micado". A Japanese-Brazilian felt much more offended when Emperor Hirohito was mocked than a German-Brazilian when Hitler was mocked or an Italian-Brazilian when Mussolini was mocked. At the time, Emperor Hirohito was not only head of state, but also the central figure of Japan's official religion, Shinto, and was worshipped at domestic altars as a descendant of the gods.

Degrading reports about the Japanese were common in the Brazilian press during the World War II. At the Granja do Canguiri (Greater Curitiba), Japanese internees were separated from their children, performed heavy farm work, being ridiculed and humiliated. Students who contributed to the war effort were "rewarded" with visits to the Granja, where the inmates were exhibited as in a human zoo. In 1945, David Nasser and Jean Marzon, the country's most famous journalist-photographer duo, published in O Cruzeiro, the magazine with the largest circulation at the time, an illustrated article in which they intended to teach Brazilians how to distinguish a Japanese from a Chinese. David Nasser wrote, among other things, that the Japanese could be distinguished by their "repulsive, short-sighted, insignificant appearance". According to the writer Roney Cytrynowicz, "the oppression against Japanese immigrants, unlike what happened to Italians and Germans in São Paulo, makes it clear that the Estado Novo conducted a large-scale racist campaign against them – under the pretext of accusations of sabotage".

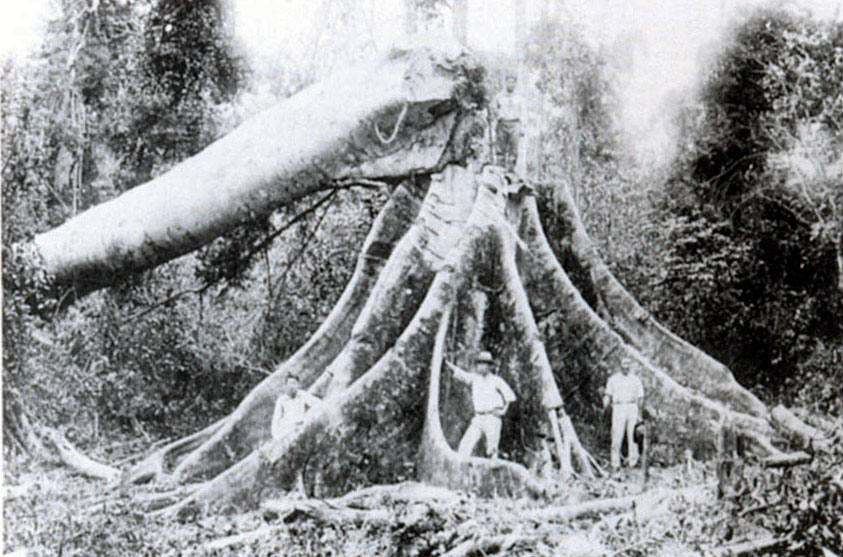
Japanese immigrants clearing untouched forest.

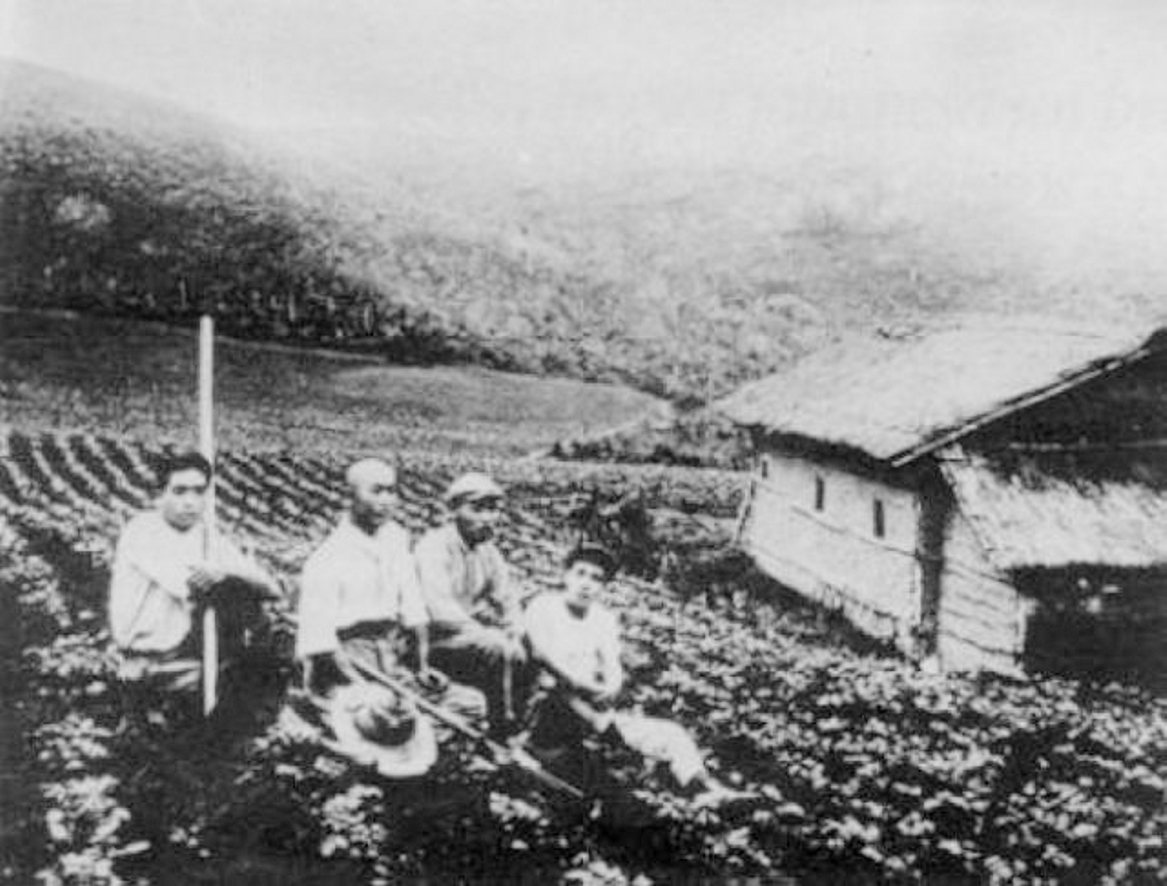
Japanese immigrants with their potato plantation.

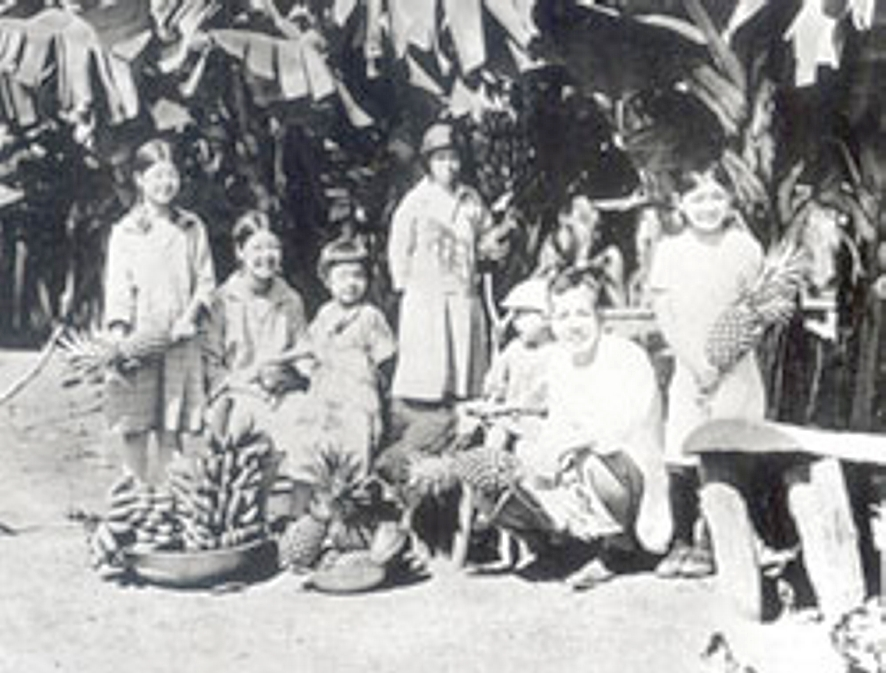
Family of Japanese immigrants.

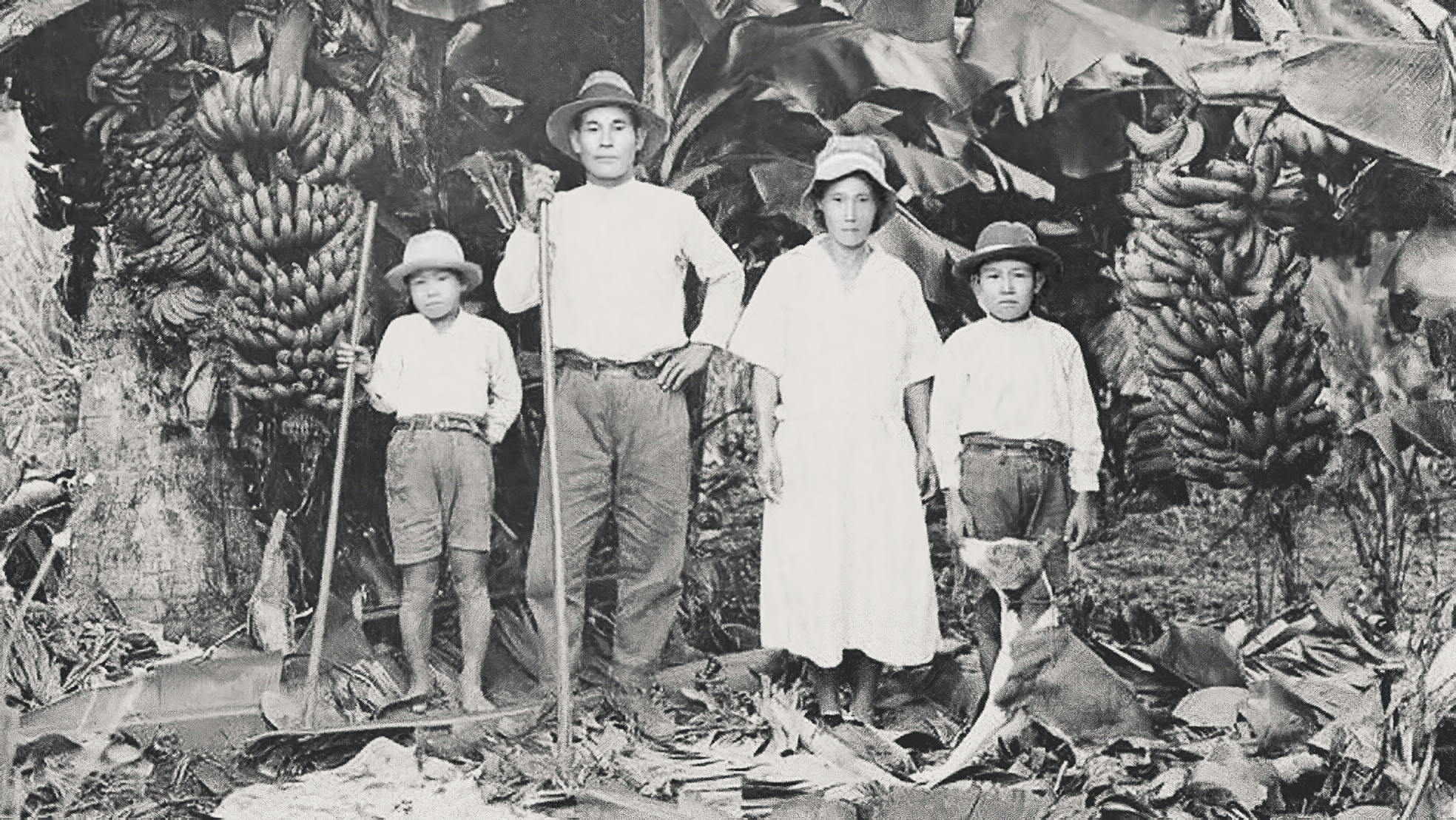
Family of Japanese immigrants.

=== Post-war ===
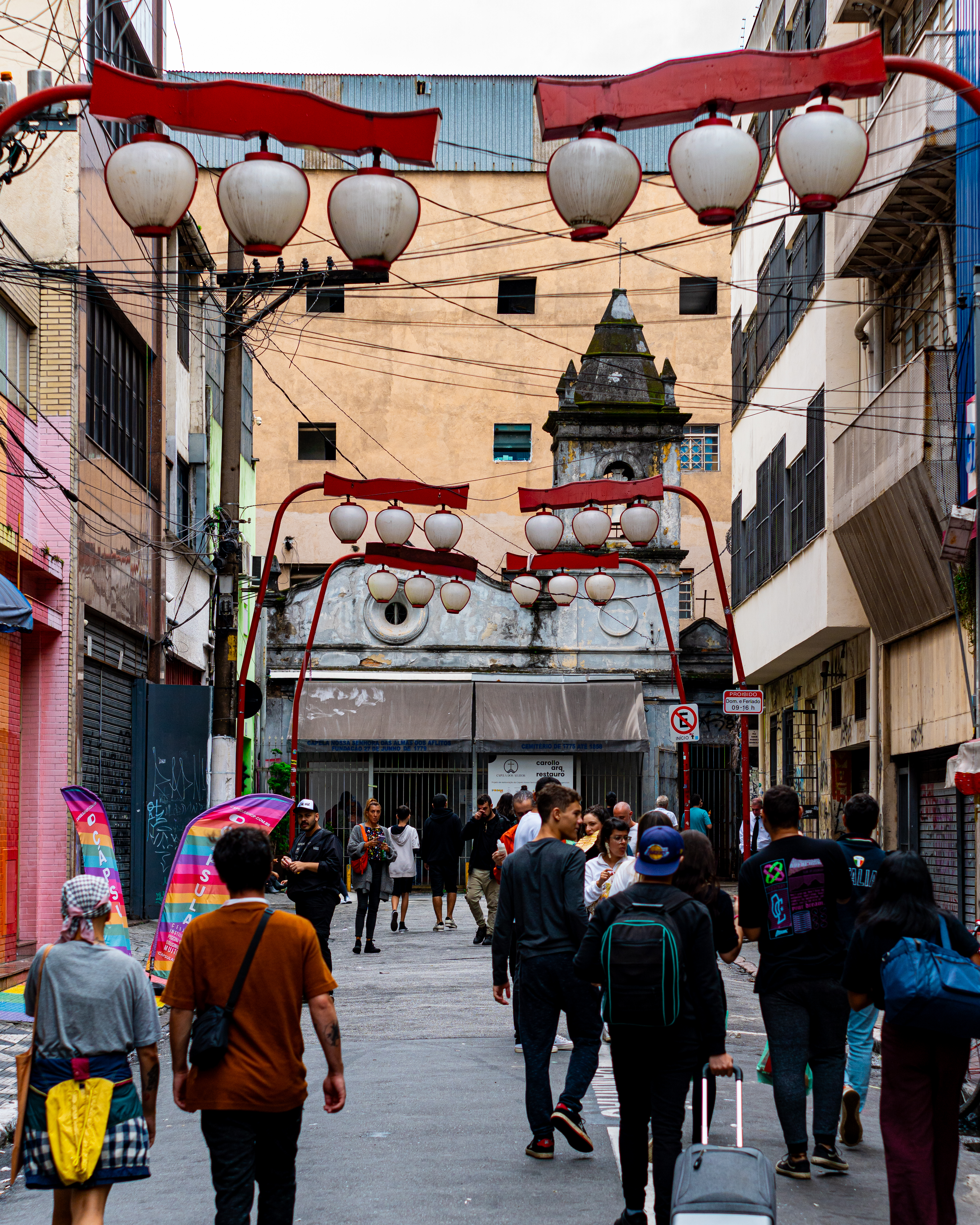
Liberdade neighborhood, Rua dos Aflitos. Liberdade today is a multiethnic neighborhood that houses Japanese, Chinese, Korean and Taiwanese immigrants

When World War II ended, immigrants began to receive letters from their relatives who were in Japan reporting on the difficulties of the country after the war. For almost all the families settled in Brazil, it was the end of the dream of returning to Japan. Immigrants became convinced of the need to prepare their children to succeed in Brazilian society. To this end, many Japanese-Brazilians moved from the countryside to the city.

At this time, Shindo Renmei, a terrorist organization formed by Japanese-Brazilians, emerged and murdered Nikkei who believed in Japanese defeat. The murders committed by Shindo Renmei and the anti-Japanese sentiment of the time caused several violent conflicts between Brazilians and Japanese-Brazilians.

Brazilian politicians continued to value the European immigrant as the most desirable. Decree-Law No. 7,967 of 1945 regulated immigration policy and stated that the entry of immigrants would be based on the need to preserve and develop, in the ethnic composition of the population, the most convenient characteristics of their European ancestry.

After the murder of the truck driver Pascoal de Oliveira by the Japanese truck driver Kababe Massame, after an argument, in July 1946, the population of Osvaldo Cruz, in the interior of the state of São Paulo, which was already upset with the two Shindo Renmei attacks in the city, took to the streets and invaded houses willing to mistreat the Japanese. The lynching of the Japanese was only fully controlled with the intervention of an army detachment from Tupã.

Besides preferring the European immigrant, some Brazilian politicians proposed extremely anti-Japanese measures.

During the 1946 National Constituent Assembly, an amendment No. 3165 proposed by Miguel Couto Filho (son of the 1934 constituent deputy) was put to a vote, which simply stated: "The entry into the country of Japanese immigrants of any age and from any source is prohibited". The deputy Miguel Couto Filho often spoke on the rostrum of the constituent assembly defending his constitutional amendment project by quoting a book he had written, the title of which was: "Para o futuro da pátria – Evitemos a niponização do Brasil" (English: For the future of the homeland – Let's avoid the "Japanization" of Brazil). Senator Luis Carlos Prestes got the Brazilian Communist Party to vote in favor of amendment 3165, and deputies such as Jorge Amado and João Amazonas did so. At the other extreme, Deputy Aureliano Leite firmly supported the opposite position. Rep. José Eduardo do Prado Kelly was also vehemently opposed, speaking that the amendment would "undermine our work" and proposed that, if passed, it be moved to the transitional provisions. In the final vote, there was a tie with 99 votes against and 99 in favor. Senator Fernando de Melo Viana, who was presiding over the constituent session, exercised the casting vote rejecting the amendment. By just one vote, Japanese immigration was not prohibited by the 1946 Constitution.

Japanese immigration to Brazil by periods
1884–1893	1894–1903	1904–1913	1914–1923	1924–1933	1934–1944	1945–1949	1950–1954	1955–1959
–	–	11 868	20 398	110 191	–	12	5 447	28 819

Distribution of immigrants from Japan, natural and Brazilian – 1940/1950
Federation Unit	Absolute data		Proportions (%)	
Federation Unit	1940	1950	1940	1950
Pernambuco	636	836	0,351	0,456
Pará	467	421	0,323	0,326
Minas Gerais	893	917	0,618	0,710
Rio de Janeiro	380	1086	0,263	0,841
Federal District	538	392	0,372	0,303
São Paulo	132 216	108 912	91,484	84,302
Paraná	8 064	15 393	5,580	11,915
Mato Grosso do Sul	1 128	1 172	0,780	0,907
Brazil	144 523	129 192	100	100

At that time, Japanese-Brazilians began to play a more active role in politics. One of the first political events occurred after a measure imposed by the government of the State of São Paulo, which had the objective of increasing popularity among voters, to make a tabulation of the prices of dyeing services; one of the results of this would be the reduction of the value of washing a suit from 25 to 16 cruzeiros. In the city of São Paulo alone, there were around 1,500 dyehouses and about two-thirds belonged to Japanese and their descendants in the late 1940s and early 1950s. After meetings among the community, the decision was made to elect the first Nikkei representative to the Legislative Assembly to defend the rights of Japanese and Japanese-Brazilians, and they chose Yukishige Tamura, who had already been elected councilman in 1947 in the Municipal Chamber of São Paulo. Since Japanese could not vote, the campaign was carried out with the customers of the dyeing shops, and Tamura was elected state deputy in 1950. After Tamura, other Japanese-Brazilians had their stints in politics; the first Nikkei to become a minister was Fábio Riodi Yassuda, in 1969, who was Ministry of Trade and Industry in the Médici government.

The flow of Japanese immigration resumed in the early 1950s and only ceased almost entirely in 1973. In total, almost 200,000 Japanese were welcomed as immigrants to the country. In the early 1960s, the Japanese-Brazilian population in the cities already exceeded that of the countryside. As the vast majority of families who moved to São Paulo and Paraná had few resources and were headed by Issei and Nisei, it was mandatory that the business did not require a large initial investment or advanced knowledge of Portuguese. Consequently, many of the settlers began to engage in small businesses or basic services, including dyeing. In the 1970s, 80% of the 3,500 establishments that washed and ironed the clothes of São Paulo's citizens were owned by Japanese. According to the anthropologist Célia Sakurai: "The business was convenient for families because they could live in the back of the dyehouse and do all the work without having to hire employees. In addition, the communication required by the activity was brief and simple".

After World War II, there was a large rural exodus that took most of the Japanese-Brazilian community from the countryside to the cities, in the metropolitan regions or interior, becoming mainly merchants, owning laundries, grocery stores, fairs, hairdressers, mechanical workshops, among others. Other families decided to live in the suburban area to engage in horticultural activities and to be close to good schools for their children. By 1952, 34.1% of Japanese immigrants were engaged in horticultural activities, while those in coffee had dropped to 27.5% and cotton to 20.5%. The city of São Paulo became the city with the largest number of Japanese outside Japan.

In the urban environment, the Japanese began to work mainly in sectors related to agriculture as market traders or owners of small fruit, vegetable or fish stores. Working in greengrocers and market stalls was made easier by the contact that urban Japanese had with those who had stayed in the countryside, as the suppliers were usually friends or relatives. Whichever activity the family chose, it was up to the first-born to work alongside their parents. The custom was a Japanese tradition of delegating to the eldest son the continuation of the family activity and also the need to help pay for the studies of the younger brothers. While the eldest worked, the younger siblings entered technical courses, such as accounting, mainly because it was easier to deal with numbers than with Portuguese. As for colleges, the preferred ones were engineering, medicine and law, which guaranteed money and social prestige. In 1958, Japanese descendants already represented 21% of Brazilians with education above high school. In 1977, they were 2.5% of the population of São Paulo, and accounted for 13% of those who passed the University of São Paulo, 16% of those who passed the Technological Institute of Aeronautics (ITA) and 12% of those selected at the Getulio Vargas Foundation (FGV).

=== Reversal of migration flow ===
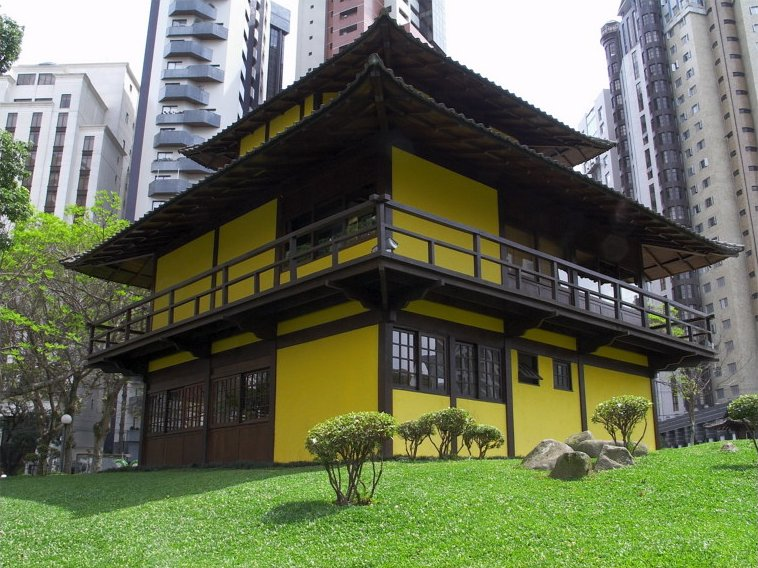
Japan Square, Curitiba.

From the end of the 1980s, there was a reversal of the migratory flow between Brazil and Japan, because, with the reflexes of the economic crisis of the 1980s, in addition to the consequences of the Collor Plan and Japan's demand for workforce, about 85 000 Japanese and descendants living in Brazil decided to try life in Japan between 1980 and 1990. Japanese descendants and their spouses, with or without Japanese ancestry, and their mixed-race or non-Japanese children, began to emigrate to Japan in search of better job opportunities. These Brazilian migrants are known as dekasegi (出稼ぎ), although the word in Japan includes all migrant workers, even Japanese from rural areas who go to work in large urban centers.

In 2008, there were about 300,000 Brazilians living in Japan legally, most of them working as laborers in industry. The cities with the most Brazilians are: Hamamatsu, Aichi, Shizuoka, Kanagawa, Saitama and Gunma.

Due to the severe financial crisis faced by Japan, thousands of Brazilians have returned to Brazil in recent years. By 2014, the Brazilian community in the country had shrunk to 177,953 people. Brazilians in Japan form the fourth largest community of foreign workers residing in the country, after Chinese, Koreans and Filipinos.

== Social aspects ==
=== Culture ===
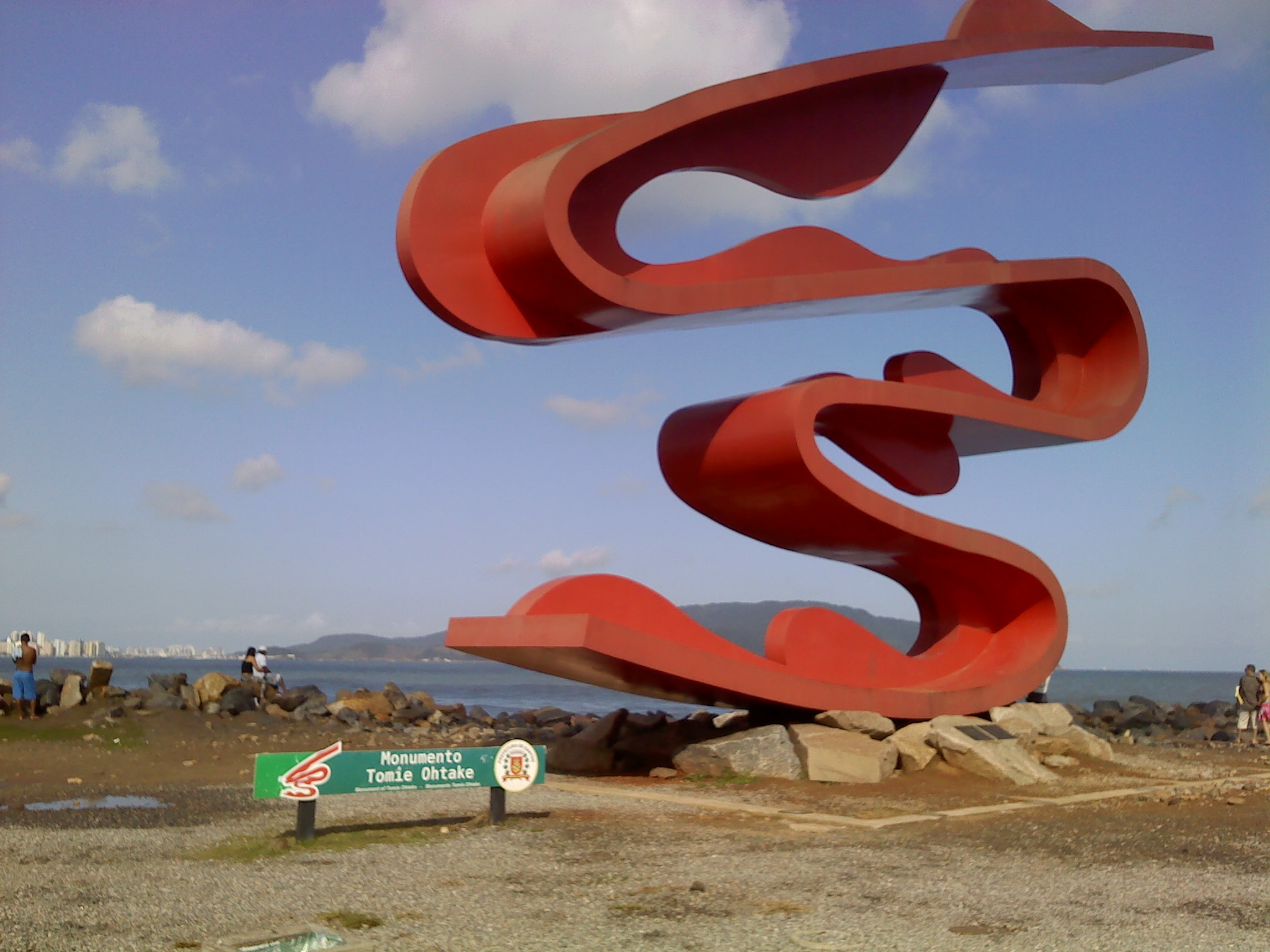
Sculpture in honor of 100 years of Japanese immigration by artist Tomie Ohtake.

One of the contributions of the Japanese colony in the Brazilian development is in the field of plastic arts, where the Japanese-Brazilian school was developed. Their constancy in participating in salons, exhibitions and events was decisive in attracting attention and maintaining contacts between artists. With the arrival of post-war Japanese immigrants, these activities took on a new impetus – ceramists, plastic artists, craftsmen, photographers arrived in Brazil bringing novelties in aesthetic conceptions that helped to "compose and give new shape to the plastic arts of Brazil", in the words of Antônio Henrique Bittencourt Cunha Bueno.

At the end of the 1970s, the Japanese-Brazilians had a different situation in terms of interaction compared to the times of the World War II, when they were viewed with suspicion by the population and the government. In these new times, the galleries systematically acquired the production of abstracts, and after the first Biennials, opportunities were opened to disseminate their productions and conquer the critics. There were collectors interested in these artists, both in Brazil and abroad.

The Liberdade neighborhood in the city of São Paulo represents an example of Japanese influence in Brazil, with several red porticos of Shinto temples. There are yakisoba, sushi and sashimi restaurants, karaoke establishments and supermarkets where you can buy nattō and different types of soy sauce. Even the most famous Brazilian drink, the caipirinha, has been adapted into a Japanese version with sake: the sakerinha.

==== Representation in the media ====
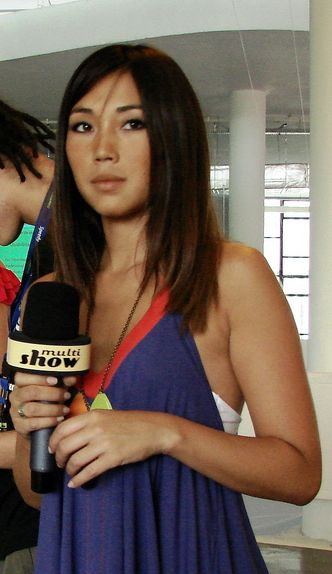
Daniele Suzuki is Brazil's best-known Japanese-Brazilian actress.

Brazilians of Japanese descent have little visibility in the national media. The presence of Japanese descendants in commercials, soap operas and films is rare and characterized by stereotypes, since "the beauty standard imposed in Brazil is still for characters played by white actors". Artists of Oriental origin complain that they only get cartoonish and stereotypical Japanese roles, such as market vendors, pastry chefs, tech enthusiasts, martial arts practitioners or sushi sellers. During television auditions for a role, there are reports of actors being forced into a "Japanese accent", even though the Japanese community is in its fourth and fifth generation in Brazil. It is difficult for an oriental actor to get a "normal" role that is not related to his ethnic origin. Actress Daniele Suzuki says that, since she has Japanese origins, her characters "were always stereotypical, funny" and that she "always appeared in a kimono".

Artists, activists and entities of the Japanese community especially criticize Rede Globo. According to the newspaper Folha de S. Paulo, in 2016, for the soap opera Sol Nascente, oriental actors who tested for the roles were dismissed and the broadcaster cast white artists to play characters of Japanese origin. Members of the Japanese community accuse the broadcaster of racism and of fostering "yellowface", a practice similar to "blackface", when actors are cast to play roles of an ethnic group to which they do not belong. This practice is nothing new at Rede Globo: in the 2014 soap opera Geração Brasil, a white actor played a South Korean and had to use adhesive tape to change the shape of his eyes. The choice of white actors to play Japanese characters caused outrage on social media.

=== Demographics ===
Distribution of Japanese-Brazilians by states
State	Japanese-Brazilian population
São Paulo	693 495
Paraná	143 588
Pernambuco	89 442
Other states	489 898
Total	1 405 685

According to an IBGE survey in 2000, there were 70 932 Japanese-born immigrants living in Brazil (compared to 158 087 in 1970). Of the Japanese, 51 445 lived in São Paulo. Most of the immigrants were over 60 years old, since immigration to Brazil practically ended in the middle of the 20th century.

In 2008, IBGE published a book on the Japanese diaspora and estimated that, in 2000, there were 1,405,685 people of Japanese descent in Brazil. Japanese immigration has been concentrated in São Paulo and in 2000, 49.3% of Japanese and descendants lived in this state. There were 693,495 people of Japanese origin in São Paulo, followed by Paraná with 143,588. More recently, Brazilians of Japanese descent are making their presence felt in places that used to have a small population of this group. In 1960, there were 532 Japanese or descendants in Bahia, while in 2000, there were 78 449, or 0.6% of the state's population. Northern Brazil (excluding Pará) saw its Japanese population increase from 2,341 in 1960 (0.2% of the total population) to 54,161 (0.8%) in 2000. During the same period, in the Central-West it increased from 3,582 to 66,119 (0.7% of the population).

Throughout Brazil, there are more than 1.4 million people of Japanese origin, with the highest percentages found in the states of São Paulo (1.9%), Paraná (1.5%) and Mato Grosso do Sul (1.4%). The lowest percentages were found in Roraima and Alagoas (with only 8 Japanese). The percentage of Brazilians with Japanese ancestry increased largely among children and adolescents. In 1991, 0.6% of Brazilians aged 0–14 had it. By 2000, they were 4%, as a result of the return of dekasegi to Brazil.

The population of Japanese origin in Brazil is extremely urban. If at the beginning of immigration almost all Japanese were in rural areas, in 1958, 55.1% were already in urban centers. By 1988, 90% were in urban centers. This early rural exodus had a direct influence on the occupational profile and high level of education of this group. While in 1958, 56% of the Nikkei population was engaged in agriculture, by 1988 this figure had fallen to only 12%. Meanwhile, the percentage of technical (16%) and administrative (28%) workers in the secondary and tertiary sectors increased.

The city of São Paulo has the highest concentration of Japanese-Brazilians – 326,000 according to the 1988 census. The Liberdade neighborhood, in the center of the capital of São Paulo, was the Japanese quarter of the city, although today it only maintains the characteristic shops and restaurants, with increasing influence of Chinese and Korean communities. The São Paulo municipalities with the largest population of Japanese-Brazilians are Mogi das Cruzes, Osvaldo Cruz and Bastos.

Other important centers of Japanese-Brazilian presence are Paraná, Rio de Janeiro and Pernambuco. In Paraná, most Japanese-Brazilians live in the capital Curitiba, in populous municipalities in the north of the state such as Maringá, Londrina, and in smaller municipalities such as Assaí and Uraí, but with a higher percentage of Nikkei in their population.

In relative terms, the municipalities of Assaí in Paraná and Bastos in São Paulo have the highest concentration of Japanese-Brazilians – respectively, 15% and 11.4% of their inhabitants. In 1934, while 10,828 Japanese lived in the city, 120,811 worked in the countryside. Despite the agricultural origin of most Japanese immigrants, today about 90% of the Japanese-Brazilian community lives in cities.

=== Economy ===
Japanese immigrants improved the farming and fishing skills of Brazilians and helped spread food production techniques through hydroponics and plasticulture. Their work in the acclimatization and development of several types of fruits and vegetables previously unknown in Brazil is remarkable; in total, they brought more than 50 types of food, including persimmon, fuji apple, mandanrin orange and strawberry. As a consequence, the states that received the immigrants had an increase in income and GDP. By offering new foods that were not part of the national diet, they changed the eating habits of Brazilians.

In addition to the new technologies in agriculture developed by Japanese immigrants, another characteristic of Japanese-Brazilian farmers was cooperativism. In a statement given by the former Minister of Agriculture of Brazil, João Roberto Rodrigues, he summarizes the cooperative movement of the Japanese immigrants: "Thanks to their production methods, especially in the fruit and vegetable sector, green belts were established close to the main urban centers, ensuring self-sufficiency in vegetables, fruits and animal products such as eggs and chickens. The associative mentality, on the other hand, gave rise to large agricultural cooperatives that served as a model for various market organization initiatives". Another fundamental contribution that Japanese farmers brought to the country was the innovative technique of intensive agriculture, which was a result of planting techniques developed in Japan, because in that country, due to the lack of space, large quantities were produced in small areas. On December 17, 1956, the National Federation of Agricultural Cooperatives of Colonization was founded, which was called the Federation of Immigration and Colonization Cooperatives. This institution was created to support Japanese immigrant farmers, promoting exchanges between these pioneers living in Brazil and Japan. Since 1994, the work has been expanded with personal training and the improvement of techniques for Nikkei producers from all over Latin America.

The concentration of Nikkei around the city of São Paulo contributed to the formation of the Green Belt of São Paulo. The Japanese-Brazilians settled around the capital due to the fact that this community produced a considerable amount of vegetables, which is a highly perishable product, so the production site could not be too far from the city. The Japanese chose to produce vegetables in the area because the local climate is mild and is conducive to this culture. Mogi das Cruzes has established itself as the main center of the belt, and the Institute of Agricultural Economics stated that Nikkei producers own 50% of the rural properties in this region. Currently, this Green Belt supplies the entire Metropolitan Region of São Paulo and Rio de Janeiro.

The Japanese-Brazilian farmers also created the Green Belt of Brasília, to meet the needs of the population of the Federal District. In 1957, when the future capital of Brazil was being built, the soil in the region was very acidic, making it extra difficult to produce food, which until then had been brought in from other regions. As a result, President Juscelino Kubitschek had the idea of "importing" Japanese families to the region, and Novacap director Israel Pinheiro invited the first families to the region. According to the Federation of Nipo-Brazilian Associations of the Central-West, the main colonies are in Incra, Núcleo Rural Vargem Bonita and Riacho Fundo. There are also Nikkei farmers in the rural areas of Taguatinga and Planaltina. The Vargem Bonita region alone is responsible for 40% of the market supply in the Federal District and of the 67 farms there, 43 still belong to Japanese settlers and their descendants.

Fruit picking, previously restricted to properties close to consumer centers, has expanded with the influence of immigrants to different cities in the interior of the state of São Paulo and other Brazilian states, employing the most advanced technologies to the point of representing an important item in the country's trade balance. Thirty-eight municipalities in 6 Brazilian states with a strong Japanese influence account for 28% of the fruit volume. Depending on the crop, the representability reaches more than 80%. Forty-four municipalities with a strong Japanese influence from four Brazilian states account for 21% of the volume of vegetables, reaching more than 90% in some products. In 1940, the Superintendence of Coffee Business reported that the Japanese living in São Paulo did not represent even 3.5% of the state's population, but their participation in agriculture represented: 100% of the production of ramie, silk, peaches and strawberries; 99% of mint and tea; 80% of potatoes and vegetables; 70% of eggs; 50% of bananas; 40% of cotton and 20% of coffee.

Since Brazil is a tropical country, Brazilian technicians and agronomists did not believe that it was possible to produce apples in the country, importing the fruit from Argentina, until the Japanese agronomist Kenshi Ushirozawa demonstrated that it was conceivable to produce apples in Santa Catarina with superior quality to the imported ones. Based on the experience of Santa Catarina, the Agricultural Cooperative of Cotia organized and implemented a settlement of rural producers in the municipality of São Joaquim, where its members began to produce apples, mainly of the Fuji variety, which soon replaced imported apples in the 80s. Currently, Brazil is a major producer and exporter of apples, shipping mainly to Europe. Cooperatives such as Sanjo and Cooperserra that started with Japanese apple growers are responsible for major apple brands.

Until the 1970s, most of the melons consumed in Brazil were imported from Spain and Chile, but this changed in the 1980s, when imports were replaced by melons produced mainly by Japanese farmers in Brazilian territory, associated with the Agricultural Cooperative of Cotia, in the western region of the State of São Paulo. Today, Brazil is a major melon producer and exporter.

In the agricultural area, the introduction of black pepper in the region of Tomé-Açu, in Pará, which would come to be called the "black diamond" of the Amazon, should be highlighted. Through Japanese immigrants, Tomé-Açu became the world's largest producer of black pepper. The immigrants imported the first seeds from Singapore to Brazil, and with the prosperity leveraged by the Japanese, the population of the municipality more than tripled in twenty years, drawing the attention of many people in search of job opportunities, mostly migrants from Espírito Santo or the Northeast region. Even though their plantations were attacked by fusarium, the Japanese did not give up on black pepper and fought the disease, but this opened the opportunity for them to start growing other tropical crops, such as açaí, also called "black diamond", where Pará stands out as the main producer of the fruit. The growth of açaí exports was so great that it drew the attention of major newspapers such as the French Le Monde and the American The New York Times.

In addition to the food brought by Japanese immigrants to Brazil, there is also the great expansion of Brazilian poultry farming, which only increased when mother birds were brought from Japan, combined with the experience of Japanese immigrants on farms. The city of Bastos, founded by Japanese settlers, has poultry farming as its main activity, along with the title of "egg capital". Its main event is the Festa do Ovo (English: Egg Festival), a celebration with international repercussions and officially recognized by the government of the State of São Paulo, which is included in the calendar of agricultural events of the Secretariat of Agriculture and Supply and the Ministry of Agriculture. Currently, Bastos is the largest egg producer in Brazil and Latin America, producing 14 million eggs per day, which corresponds to 40% of all production in the state and 20% in the country.

Japanese immigrants also innovated in the fishing activities developed in Brazil with the introduction of new techniques and knowledge of navigation that increased production. One of them was the introduction of vessels built based on those used in Japan. An important change can be noticed in the fishing nets, since at the time, Brazilian nets were made of cotton, which deteriorated quickly. To increase their resistance, the immigrants bathed them in water in which they boiled the bark of mangrove plants. Another innovation was the assembly of apparatus to hang the nets, allowing the visualization of the shape as if at sea and enabling possible repairs and the adaptation of the mesh shape. The Japanese also introduced glass buoys for flotation and iron doors to open the net, technological developments that led to increased productivity.

In a short time, the immigrants managed to capitalize and buy their own equipment for fishing, as well as for transporting and storing fish. The Japanese fishing activity on the coast of Santos, in the state of São Paulo, is evident. After World War II, the Japanese in this area created cooperatives, especially the Cooperativa Mista de Pesca Nipo Brasileira and the Cooperativa de Pesca Atlântica de Santos, both founded in the 50s. Much of the fish was sent to the Greater São Paulo region. The Nikkei also excelled in ocean fishing in partnership with Japanese companies that began operating in Brazil. Under the influence of the Japanese, a species not known until then was called Me-Kajike, which later became known as "meca", originated the official dish of the city of Santos. Nowadays, many big businessmen in the fishing sector have Japanese ancestry.

The contribution of the Japanese in the industrial sector from the 1960s onwards is highlighted by the fact that many industries from Japan set up their branches in Brazil, most of them associating with Japanese-Brazilian enterprises. Not only technology was implemented, but also new administrative systems that revolutionized the productivity of many Brazilian factories. From the 1970s onwards, Japanese capital concentrated on expanding the country's agricultural frontier by exploiting the cerrado region, and on the production of raw materials, with a focus on mineral exploitation. The presence of the Japanese community is also pointed out as a reason for the attraction of Japanese companies in Brazil.

==== Fiber production ====
Although there had been ramie plantations in Brazil since 1884, the largest production of this crop took place in the city of Uraí, as a result of the work of the Companhia de Terras Sul América which, after being founded, granted the land to the Companhia Nambei Toshi Kabushiki Kaisha, giving rise to the colonization of the area that is now Uraí. With the result of the first cultivation, production began to expand and has been marketed both in Brazil and abroad. In the 1970s, the city became the largest producer of ramie in the world, earning the nickname "ramie capital of the world". The crop occupied 22% of the total area of the municipality and the Nikkei Susumo Itimura became known as the "king of ramie". With competition from synthetic fiber, ramie production declined and farmers in the region sought to diversify crops.

Besides ramie, another important crop for fiber production that had the Japanese as introducers and main growers was jute. The pioneer of this project was the deputy Tsukasa Uyetsuka, who saw the potential of the Amazon region due to its climate. The fiber was indispensable to international trade, as it was used in sacks of coffee and other goods to absorb moisture and preserve their contents, but few countries produced it on a large scale. In 1930, Uyetsuka bought 1,500 hectares in Parintins, now called Vila Amazônia, and established the Escola Superior de Colonização do Japão (Nihon Koto Takushoku Gakko) to train specialists in colonization work. These students were known as koutakusei and were taught cultivation techniques, construction skills and the Portuguese language. At first, jute farming did not produce good results, as the plant did not adapt very well to the region, but with the acclimatization work done by Riota Oyama with the creation of the "Oyama variety", it became viable in that region. In 1935, Uyetsuka obtained funds from companies such as Mitsubishi, Mitsui and Sumitomo, and founded Companhia Industrial Amazonense, a subsidiary in Brazil of Cia. Industrial da Amazônia, created in Japan. Jute farming reached its peak in the 1960s, with more than 50,000 farmers involved in its planting and represented more than a third of the GDP of Amazonas, leading Brazil to self-sufficiency in jute fiber in 1952.

Although silk was already produced in Brazil since the era of D. Pedro I, the improvement of the product was achieved with the Japanese immigrants, as they were responsible for producing the best silk thread in the world; their products gained names that pay homage to Japanese culture, such as Mahô, Gensô and Katakakê. In 1936, immigrants produced 57% of Brazil's silk, and in 1940, in the state of São Paulo, they produced 100% of the state's silk. Japanese immigrants founded Sociedade Colonizadora do Brasil Ltda, which has the Japanese name of Burajiru Takushoku Kumiai, abbreviated as Bratac, which is currently the country's leading spinning industry.

The principal crop that reduced dependence on coffee as Brazil's main export was cotton. Before 1933, cotton did not represent even 5% of Brazilian exports. However, in 1934, their share became 13% and in 1936 16%, and in that same year, 1936, Japanese farmers produced 46% of Brazilian cotton. In 1942, 39.2% of all Japanese-Brazilians were engaged in cotton growing. The main Brazilian export market was Japan, and between January and July 1939, 51% of the product leaving the port of Santos was destined for the Japanese market. Due to the increasing development of relations between the two countries, the rapporteur of the United States Department of Agriculture stated in a report that, since a large part of the production and marketing of cotton in southern Brazil was in Japanese hands, he assumed that this product was more preferred by Japanese buyers. At the time, it was reported that "much of the cotton crop in southern Brazil belongs to Japanese and is sold to Japanese industrialists". The drop in sales to Japan occurred due to the conflict in World War II, as the United States prohibited the passage of cargo ships through conflict zones. In 1952, the percentage of Japanese immigrants engaged in horticultural activities was 34.1%, while those in coffee had dropped to 27.5% and cotton to 20.5%. Currently, the Maeda Group, founded by Takayuki Maeda, is considered the largest verticalized chain of the crop in the world with operations from seed genetics to spinning.

=== Education ===
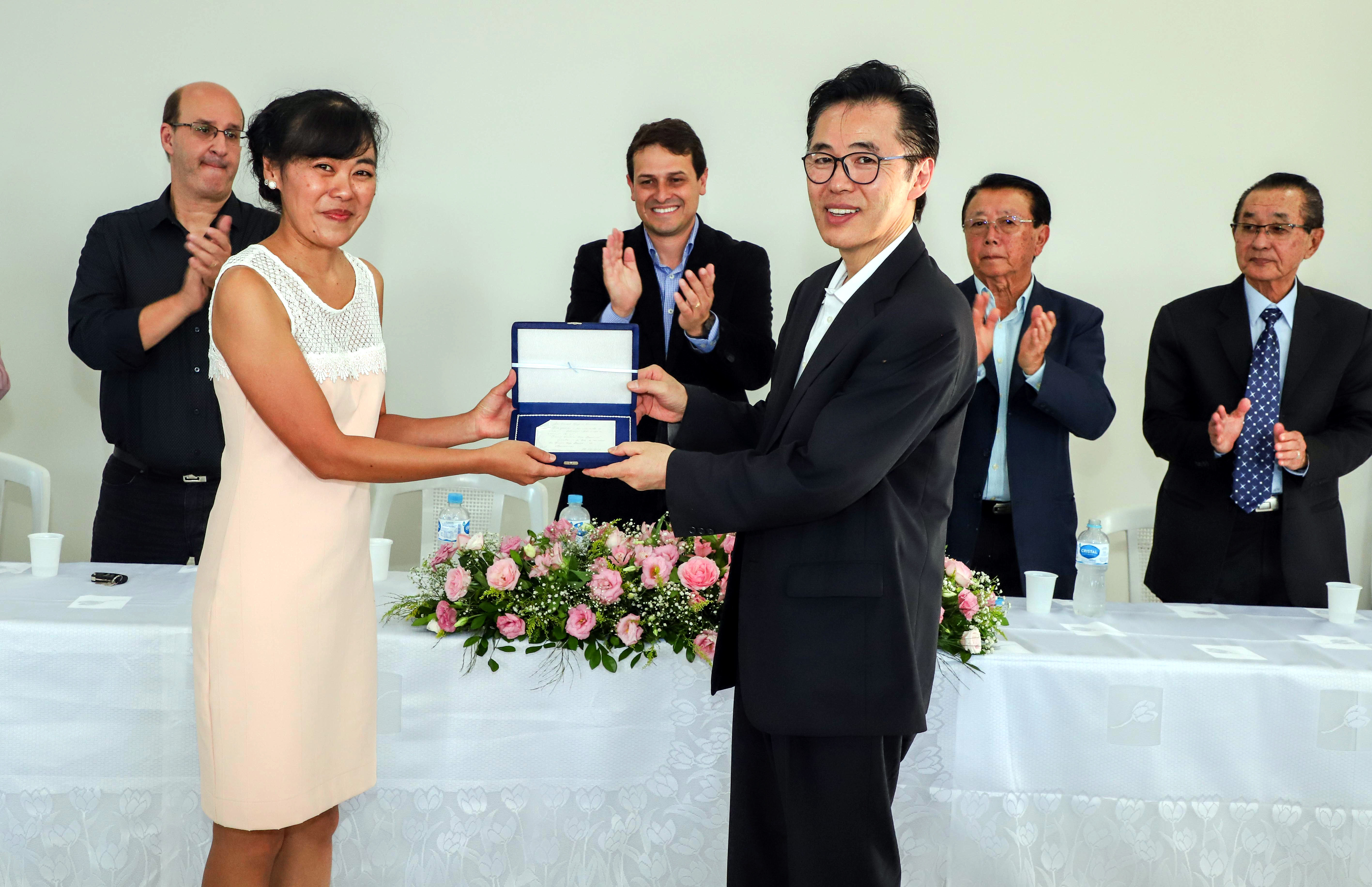
Inauguration of a multipurpose hall at the Japanese-Brazilian School in Apucarana, Paraná. The work was funded by the Japanese government.

According to the newspaper Gazeta do Povo, "the common sense is that Japanese descendants are studious, disciplined, do well in school, pass the entrance exam more easily and, in most cases, have great affinities with mathematical careers". According to a survey carried out by USP and UNESP, Japanese-Brazilians, who are 1.2% of the population of the city of São Paulo, represent 4% of those enrolled in the entrance exam and about 15% of those approved. In the most competitive careers, such as Medicine and Engineering, they represent, on average, 15% and 20% of enrolled students, respectively. According to IBGE data, 28% of Japanese-Brazilians have completed higher education, while the national average is approximately 8%. The good performance of these students is due to the fact that the Japanese carry values such as discipline, respect for hierarchy, effort and dedication, as well as the belief that education is the best way to rise economically.

Schools also played an active role in the history of the Japanese community in Brazil because, while Western communities, such as Germans and Poles, had the church as the main socializing nucleus, the Japanese had the school playing this role. In addition, the school reproduced the culture of their ancestors and maintained a nationalist mentality, as the first immigrants had plans to return to Japan. The Japanese government also sent inspectors to check on the situation in the colonies, as well as advising the communities on their activities and school education. The school trained the Nisei in the precepts of Japanese education, informing them about Japan and imparting discipline. According to data from the Secretary of Agriculture of the State of São Paulo, among immigrants over the age of 12 who disembarked at the port of Santos between 1908 and 1932, the literacy rate was 89.9% among the Japanese, 71.36% among the Italians and 51.7% among the Portuguese.

The first Japanese school in Brazil, Taisho Shogakko, was founded by Professor Shinzo Miyazaki at his residence in 1914, and was officially recognized the following year. Initially, Japanese schools taught subjects related to Japan with a view to returning to their homeland. Later, schools founded by Japanese-Brazilians began to incorporate Brazilian academic curricula.

Since 1924, with the greater intervention of the Japanese government in immigration, the Brazilian government, through the Japanese consulate, began to create support entities such as schools and hospitals. In 1938, there were 294 Japanese schools, 20 German schools and 8 Italian schools in São Paulo. After the World War II, the Japanese began to occupy an increasing number of places at the University of São Paulo; in 1960, 10% of students had Japanese origins. In the 1970s, the number of Japanese descendants entering public universities increased. According to Datafolha data from 1995, 53% of Japanese-Brazilians of adult age had a university degree, while 9% of the rest of the Brazilian population had it.

Immigrants were also responsible for the insertion of the soroban in Brazil, which is a mathematical calculation instrument that facilitates the understanding of numbering systems, assisting in mathematical education, as it helps in the improvement and development of concentration, motor coordination and dexterity, agility of mental calculations and development of logical reasoning. The first disseminator of soroban in Brazil was Professor Fukutaro Kato who, in 1958, published the first book of its kind in Brazil, entitled "O Soroban pelo Método Moderno". The soroban was regulated by the Ministry of Education in 2002 as a facilitating tool in the process of inclusion of visually impaired students in schools.

Another legacy of the Nikkei in Brazil was the introduction of the Kumon method. In 1977, the first teaching unit with this methodology was inaugurated in South America, in Londrina, after a visit to Japan by a Brazilian of Japanese descent, who was impressed to see a Kumon unit. After contacting the Japanese institute, he obtained authorization to bring the method to the country. In Brazil, the Kumon method has about 100 thousand students and is one of the main brands of Japan in Brazilian education.

=== Sports ===
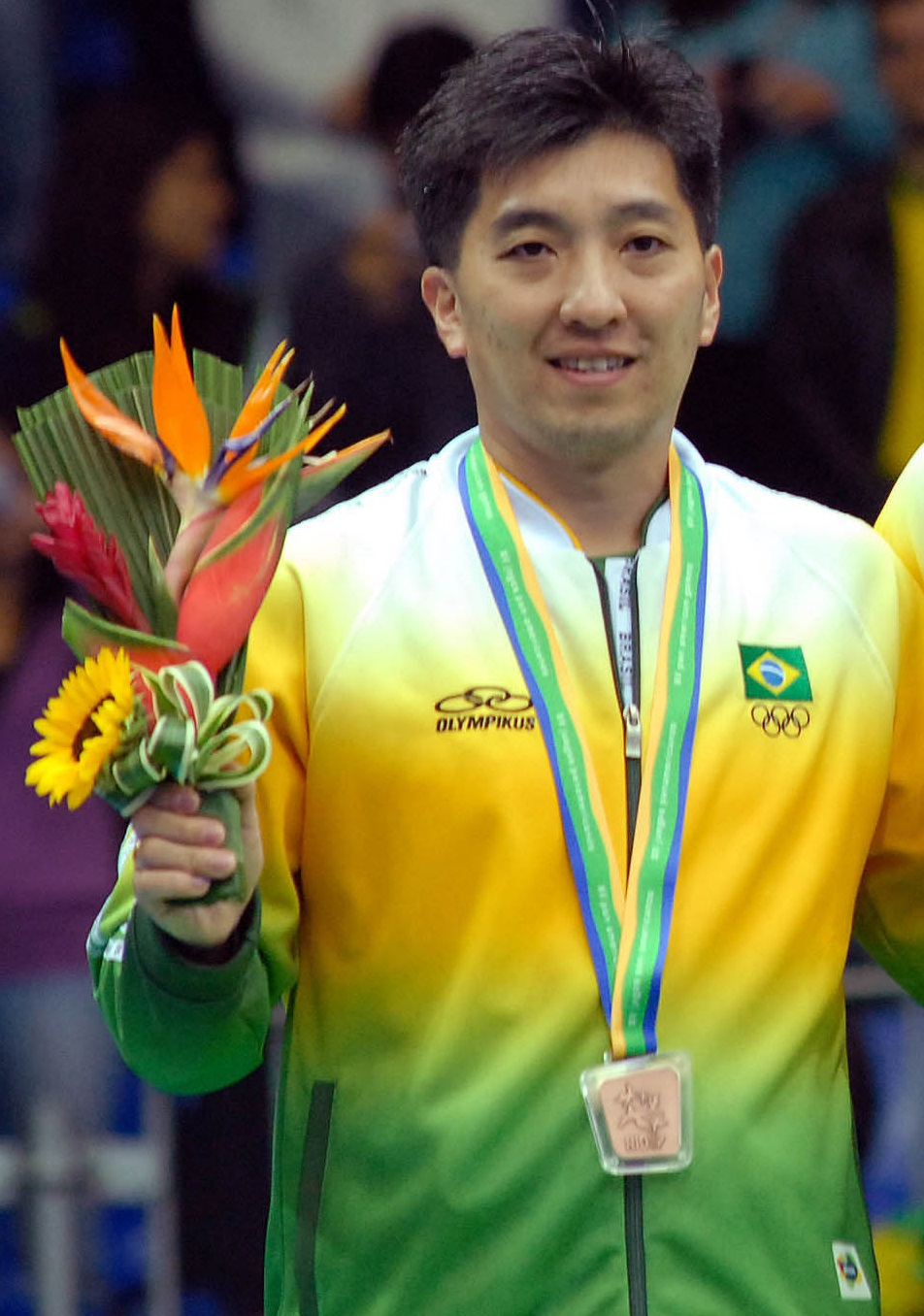
Hugo Hoyama, the second athlete with the most medals in Pan American Games.

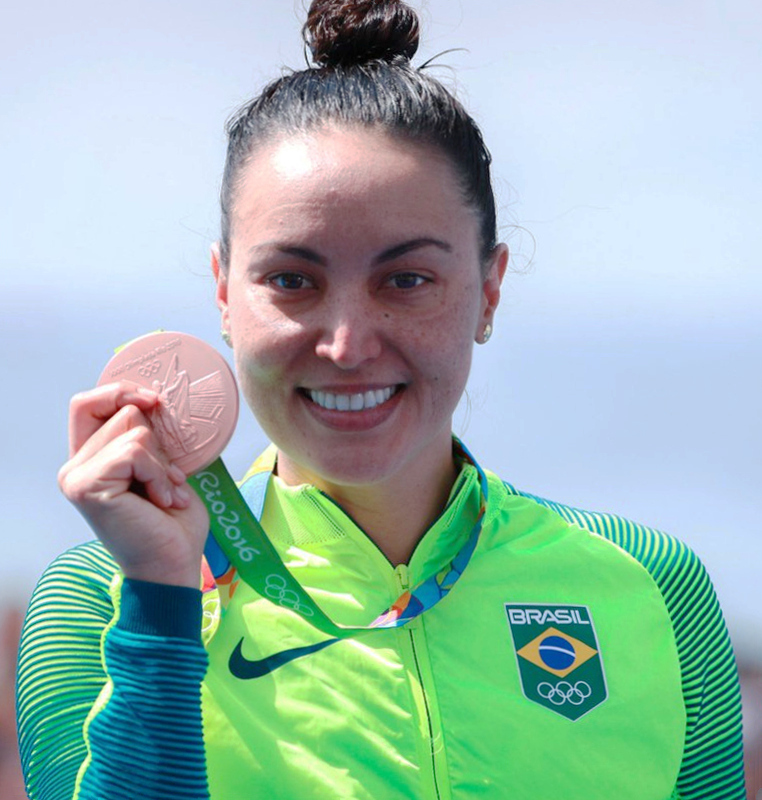
Poliana Okimoto, Olympic, World and Pan-American medalist.

The Japanese-Brazilians were responsible for the introduction and dissemination of sports such as: aikido, karate, gateball, jujutsu, kendo, urban golf, softball and sumo. Although baseball was already practiced before the arrival of Japanese immigrants, it was through them that the sport developed in Brazil. The presence of Japanese-Brazilians in judo is also noteworthy, as they won three Olympic bronze medals for Brazil, the first being won by Chiaki Ishii at the 1972 Summer Olympics, the second by Luiz Onmura at the 1984 Summer Olympics and the third by Felipe Kitadai at the 2012 Summer Olympics. In judo, there has always been at least one Japanese-Brazilian medalist in every edition of the Pan American Games in which Brazil has participated. After the 2012 Summer Olympics, judo became the sport that earned Brazil the most medals.

The Nikkei contributed to table tennis, since it was a sport very practiced in the colonies. Ricardo Inokuchi was the first Brazilian player to do an internship in Japan, which was possible thanks to the contacts that Brazilian players had with Japanese people linked to the sport in Japan. He has become a reference for a new generation of players, such as Cláudio Kano and Hugo Hoyama, who are among the top ten Brazilian medalists at Pan American Games.

Tetsuo Okamoto won the first Olympic medal for Brazilian swimming at the 1952 Helsinki Games, a bronze medal in the 1500-meter freestyle. Okamoto also broke Brazilian and South American records, and won two gold medals and a silver medal at the 1951 Pan American Games. He got inspired to practice more after a group of Japanese swimmers, known as the "Flying Fish", which included world record holder Hironoshin Furuhashi, visited Brazil. Other prominent Nikkei in Brazilian swimming are: Poliana Okimoto, Rogério Aoki Romero, Lucas Vinicius Yoko Salatta, Diogo Yabe, Tatiane Sakemi, Mariana Katsuno, Raquel Takaya, Cristiane Oda Nakama, Celina Endo, among others.

There is also significant Japanese-Brazilian participation in chess, with the first Brazilian absolute chess champion of Japanese origin being Roberto Tadashi Watanabe in 1990. The following year, Everaldo Matsuura became champion, and in 2001 and 2003 he was also vice-champion of Brazilian chess, besides representing the country in Chess Olympics. Another Nikkei who became Brazilian chess champion in the absolute category was Alexandr Fier, in 2005; Fier was Brazilian vice-champion in 2011. In women's chess, Juliana Sayumi Terao, Brazilian champion in the women's absolute category in 2012, and vice-champion in 2009, 2013 and 2014, stands out. Fier and Juliana also represented Brazil in Chess Olympiads. Another member of the Japanese colony in Brazil is Edson Kenji Tsuboi, who has played for Brazil at the Chess Olympics three times and is considered one of the most respected chess players.

The participation of Nikkei in soccer is marked by innovations and appearances in great teams, as well as call-ups in the Brazil and Japan national teams. An example of Nikkei in Brazilian soccer is Sérgio Echigo, who played for Sport Club Corinthians Paulista and is considered the inventor of the dribbling called "elástico", which was later perfected and popularized by Roberto Rivellino. Another Japanese-Brazilian pioneer in soccer was Alexandre Carvalho Kaneko, better known as Kaneko, who played for Santos Futebol Clube at the time of great players like Pelé, and is considered the "father" of the dribbling called "lambreta", also known as "carretilha". Ademir Ueta, known as China, played for Sociedade Esportiva Palmeiras, won the Campeonato Brasileiro de Seleções Estaduais title for São Paulo, the CONMEBOL Pre-Olympic Tournament for Palmeiras, participated in the Copa Libertadores, and was called up to participate in the 1968 Summer Olympics; he also played for teams in Portugal and Venezuela. There is also the participation of Nikkei players born in Brazil, but who were called up to the Japan National Football Team such as George Kobayashi, George Yonashiro, Marcus Tulio Tanaka and Daishiro Yoshimura.

=== Languages ===
Japanese language skills of individuals from Brazil living in Japan
Generation	Level of knowledge of Japanese				
Generation	None	Little	Regular	High	Very High
Japanese born	0%	0%	0%	82%	18%
Children	11%	19%	29%	21%	20%
Grandchildren	21%	29%	23%	15%	12%
Great-grandchildren and subsequent	72%	0%	0%	0%	28%

The issei, the first immigrants to come directly from Japan hoped to return to their homeland after a few years working in Brazil. Consequently, most immigrants raised their children at home, where only Japanese was spoken, and after studying in Brazilian schools, the children attended nihongaku, schools where they learned to read and write in Japanese.

The Japanese language is still an important element for the cultural identity of Japanese descendants in the city of São Paulo. According to a Datafolha survey published in 2008, 82% of Japanese descendants interviewed said they understood "even a little" the Japanese language. 46% of Japanese people or descendants said they could read Japanese and 43% said they could write in Japanese.

According to a survey of Japanese and Brazilian descendants living in Japan, the degree of knowledge of the Japanese language changes significantly between generations. As expected, individuals born in Japan have a high or very high level of knowledge of Japanese. Among children of Japanese, the largest group has only a fair knowledge of the language (29%), with 11% having no knowledge at all and 20% having a very high knowledge. Among grandchildren, the largest group has little knowledge (29%) and the percentage of those who have none rises to 21% and those who have very high knowledge decreases to 12%. On the other hand, the great-grandchildren of Japanese or later generations show an intense polarization: 72% have no knowledge of the Japanese language and 28% have a very high level.

Another survey conducted in the Japanese communities of Aliança in Mirandópolis and Fukuhaku-mura in Suzano, both in the interior of São Paulo, showed that the use of the Japanese language is being lost over the generations. The first generation born in Brazil, the Nisei, reported alternating between the use of Portuguese and Japanese. Regarding the use of Japanese at home, 64.3% of the Nisei informants from Aliança and 41.5% of those from Fukuhaku said they spoke Japanese as children. In comparison, only 14.3% of the third generation, the Sansei, reported having spoken Japanese at home when they were children. This reflects that the second generation was mainly educated by their Japanese parents using the Japanese language. On the other hand, the third generation did not have much contact with their grandparents' language and most of them speak only Portuguese.

The Japanese spoken in Brazil is different from that used in Japan. In Brazil, the language has preserved some lexicons that disappeared in Japan, mainly due to the influence of the English language. For example, in the Japanese of Brazil, the archaic term "benjoo" is used to designate "banheiro" (English: bathroom). However, in Japan this word was replaced by "otearai", which comes from the English "toilet". Moreover, the Japanese spoken in Brazil is a mixture of several Japanese dialects, especially from western Japan, as most immigrants came from that area. In addition, the language of the immigrants was heavily influenced by Portuguese. As a result, the Japanese used in Brazil is called koronia-go, which means "language of the colony", and is commonly characterized by the Japanese as "an old Japanese mixed with Portuguese".

In the Japanese-Brazilian community, the use of the Japanese language is not only limited to the oral means of communication, but also in the written form in publications, such as newspapers, which were discontinued, along with the prohibition of speaking Japanese in public, in the period of the World War II. Since the beginning of immigration, different literary manifestations have been developed in the community in the form of short stories, novels, and poems.

After the World War II, descendants continued their studies in Brazilian schools with the presence of Nikkei at the highest levels of the educational scenario, encouraging bilingualism among the new generations. Before the ban on teaching foreign languages in Brazil, teachers received direct guidance from representatives of the Japanese government. In the post-war period, textbooks were developed in Brazil and organizations such as the Federação das Escolas de Ensino Japonês no Brasil, the Sociedade Brasileira de Cultura Japonesa and the Aliança Cultural Brasil-Japão emerged. Later, in 1985, the three entities joined to form the current Centro Brasileiro de Língua Japonesa, based in São Paulo.

The data show that, among immigrants to Brazil, Italians and Spaniards were those who most quickly adopted Portuguese as a language, and Japanese and Germans were those who resisted the most. Linguistic assimilation varied considerably from one group or nationality to another according to identity and language similarity. In addition, the power of the environment had an influence (in regions where immigrants stayed together in isolated groups, the native language could survive for generations, while in regions where there was more fusion between immigrants and Brazilians, the native language was quickly supplanted by Portuguese).

Foreigners and naturalized Brazilians who preferably spoke the native language (1940 census)
Nationality	Percentage
Japanese	84.71%
German	57.72%
Russians	52.78%
Polish	47.75%
Austrians	42.18%
Spanish	20.57%
Italians	16.19%

Brazil has also become a stronghold for the preservation of Okinawan language and culture, which was suppressed for many years in Japan and, with the constant use of Japanese in everyday life, it went into decline. As the immigrant community from Okinawa has maintained this language and customs in Brazil, many students of Okinawan leave Japan for Brazil to study it. Consequently, there has been a resumption in the dissemination of Okinawan culture in Japan. Currently, the language is considered an endangered cultural heritage according to UNESCO.

=== Miscegenation ===
Compared to the European immigrant groups, the miscegenation of the Japanese-Brazilians took more time to happen. Marriage with people of non-Japanese origin (gaikokujin) was not accepted by most Japanese immigrants (issei) due to the great ethnic-cultural differences: language, religion, customs, traditions and prejudices of the Japanese against Brazilians and vice versa. They also did not want to create permanent ties in Brazil, hoping to return to Japan. Initially, marriages between Japanese and non-Japanese descendants were rare, although they did happen occasionally.

For a long time, marriages among immigrants occurred through a Japanese custom called miai, an arranged marriage in which there was an intermediary between Japanese families. Marriage between people from distant Japanese provinces was common in Brazil, but not in Japan. The exception was with people from Okinawa, because for centuries there had been a certain prejudice between Okinawans and Japanese due to cultural differences.

Distribution of Japanese-Brazilians in generations
Generation	Title		Proportion	Mestizos
Generation	Japanese	Portuguese	Proportion	Mestizos
1st	Issei	Immigrants	12.51%	0%
2nd	Nisei	Children	30.85%	6%
3rd	Sansei	Grandchildren	41.33%	42%
4th	Yonsei	Great-grandchildren	12.95%	61%

It was necessary to show that the Japanese could also blend in with the rest of the Brazilian population and some of those in favor of Japanese immigration needed to prove that they could have children with Brazilians as "white" as those of Europeans. In the 1930s, cultural organizations funded publications with photos of Japanese men married to Brazilian women and their "white" children. The strategy paid off and even received the support of members of the Brazilian elite. In 1932, for example, Bruno Lobo, a professor of medicine in Rio de Janeiro, published a book entitled "De Japonês a Brasileiro", with photos of Japanese families with Brazilian women to prove that the union between Brazilians and Japanese would generate so-called "white" children. Three years later, in 1935, one of the advocates of Japanese immigration stated that the Japanese settlers were "even whiter than the Portuguese" in the Legislative Assembly of São Paulo.

After the war, there was a practice among the members of the colony of arranging marriages with people from Brazil and Japan, where photographs were sent to Japan in the hope of finding a person who would agree to travel to Brazil. In the late 1960s, many young women traveled to Brazil with the intention of getting married, even without knowing their suitors personally. People who had married in this way were even sent to Japan to give their testimonies through lectures and to seek out young women who were interested in marrying and living in Brazil.

A census conducted in the late 1950s of some 400,000 members of the colony revealed that marriages between Japanese and non-Japanese accounted for less than 2% among immigrants and less than 6% among Nikkei. Japanese immigrants rarely married non-Japanese, but their descendants, from the second and third generations onwards, increasingly began to marry people of non-Japanese origin. In 1989, the interethnic marriage rate was 45.9% in Brazil. Today, marriages between descendants and non-descendants exceed 50%.

According to a Datafolha survey published in 2008, the majority of Japanese descendants in the city of São Paulo still have romantic relationships with each other. 66% of the Japanese or descendants interviewed who have or had some kind of stable union, have or had partners belonging to the Nikkei community.

The ethnic isolation of Japanese-Brazilians weakened from the 1970s onwards. The descendants of Japanese immigrants – most of whom are now the third or fourth generation in Brazil – have integrated definitively into Brazilian society. The great-grandchildren of Japanese, mostly young, are fully integrated in Brazil and 61% are mestizo or multiracial. Generally, the bonds with Japanese culture are minimal: most of them can speak little or nothing of the Japanese language, usually they know words of domestic use. This is due to the fact that 90% of Yonsei live in urban areas and tend to assimilate Brazilian customs more than Japanese ones.

=== Politics ===
Fábio Riodi Yassuda was the first Nikkei to become a minister in Brazil.

Decree No. 383 of April 18, 1938 established several prohibitions on foreigners, including that they could not participate in political activities. In the 1940s, Japanese, German and Italian immigrants were persecuted and treated as "subjects of the Axis". After the war, there was an attempt to ban Japanese immigration through a constitutional amendment that failed by one vote and the Japanese-Brazilian community was divided over the events involving Shindo Renmei. Persecuted and divided, the community realized that it should change its image both for Brazilian society and within the colony itself, and one of the ways chosen was through politics.

In 1947, after the end of the Estado Novo, municipal elections were held again. That year, the Nisei entered as candidates, and the lawyer Yukishigue Tamura became an alternate, but after the cassation of communist candidates, he got a seat, becoming the first Nikkei to become a councilor in the state of São Paulo. In 1951, Tamura was elected to the state legislature, and was also the first Nikkei to hold that position. In 1955, he was the first Japanese-Brazilian to become a federal deputy, a position he held four times. Besides Tamura, there were also several representatives of the Japanese community who achieved the most diverse political positions. In 2010, Jorge Yanai, became the first Nikkei to assume the position of senator, representing the state of Mato Grosso.

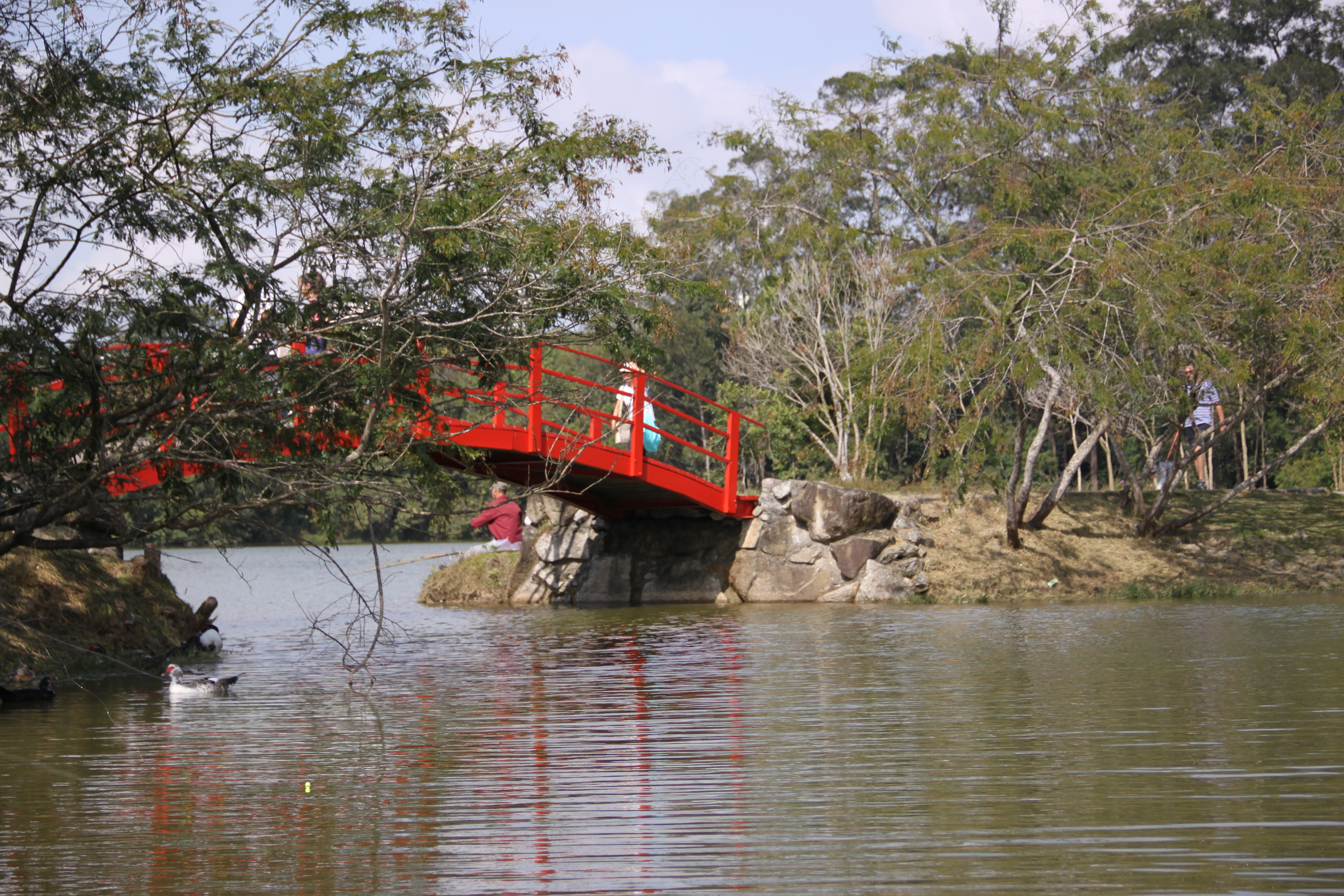
Centennial Park of Japanese Immigration in Mogi das Cruzes. It was inaugurated in 2008 by the Nisei mayor Junji Abe.

With the presence of the Nikkei in the legislative assembly of the Legislative Assembly of São Paulo, there was an increase in the Brazil-Japan interaction. Both countries began to receive delegations of deputies, diplomats, businessmen, governors, presidents and other authorities, to boost the relationship between the two countries. With the help of Japanese-Brazilian politicians, many Japanese investments in Brazil could be realized, resulting in the creation of companies, such as Usiminas, and the implementation of industries of the most diverse segments in Brazil.

The first Nikkei in the executive branch was Fábio Riodi Yassuda in 1969, who was Ministry of Trade and Industry in the Médici government. In the 1970s, Shigeaki Ueki became Minister of Mines and Energy during the Geisel government. Many Japanese descendants have distinguished themselves in Brazilian medicine, one of them being the cardiovascular surgeon Seigo Tsuzuki, who was Minister of Health in the Sarney government. During Lula's government, Luiz Gushiken took over as minister of the Secretariat of Social Communication.

=== Religion ===
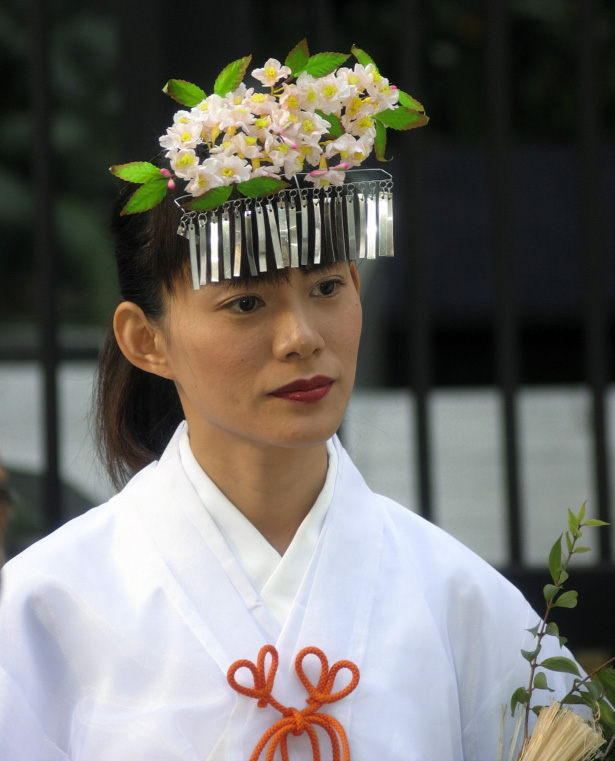
A Japanese-Brazilian girl during a Shinto celebration in Curitiba.

The Japanese immigrants were mostly Buddhists and Shintoists. In the Japanese colonies, there was the presence of Brazilian and Japanese priests to evangelize the immigrants. In 1923, Msgr. Domingos Nakamura (1856–1940), a priest of the Diocese of Nagasaki, immigrated to Brazil at the age of 58 to begin a tireless 17-year pastoral activity with the Japanese community settled in Brazil; he worked in the states of São Paulo, Mato Grosso, Paraná and Minas Gerais. He was the first Japanese missionary to work abroad and died with a reputation for sanctity on March 14, 1940; his beatification process was opened in 2002. Monsignor Domingos Nakamura was part of the descendants of the Kakure Kirishitan, Japanese Catholics who lived underground when Catholicism became illegal in Japan. According to Rafael Shoji of the Institute for Religion and Culture at Nanzan University in Nagoya, this group was very important for the "conversion of Japanese and Nikkei Brazilians to Christianity. They offered a kind of Catholicism with which the Japanese could identify". The Japanese-Brazilian Pastoral, a non-profit civic-religious association that works in the evangelization and catechesis of Japanese and their descendants or others living in Brazil, was created for the community. In 2011, Benedict XVI appointed Júlio Endi Akamine as auxiliary bishop of the Archdiocese of São Paulo, becoming the first Japanese-Brazilian to reach the rank of bishop within the Catholic Church in Brazil.

Marriage to Catholic people also contributed to the growth of this religion in the Japanese-Brazilian community. According to IBGE data from the year 2000, about 63.9% of Japanese descendants in Brazil are Catholics, which represented the renunciation of religions commonly followed in Japan, such as Buddhism and Shintoism, in the name of greater integration into Brazilian society.

Buddhism arrived in Brazil with the first Japanese immigrants, at a time when there was a movement against the arrival of non-Christian religious and monks had to dress like farmers. Buddhism arrived in Brazil as a way of preserving Japanese culture, but the number of followers is currently decreasing within the Japanese-Brazilian community. According to IBGE data, there has been a drop in the number of Buddhists; in 1991, there were more than 230,000 adherents of this religion and in 2000, the number fell to just over 214,000 followers. According to 2000 data, non-oriental followers represented the majority of Brazilian Buddhists, more than 130 thousand, and Buddhists with oriental ancestry represented another 81 thousand people.

=== Health ===
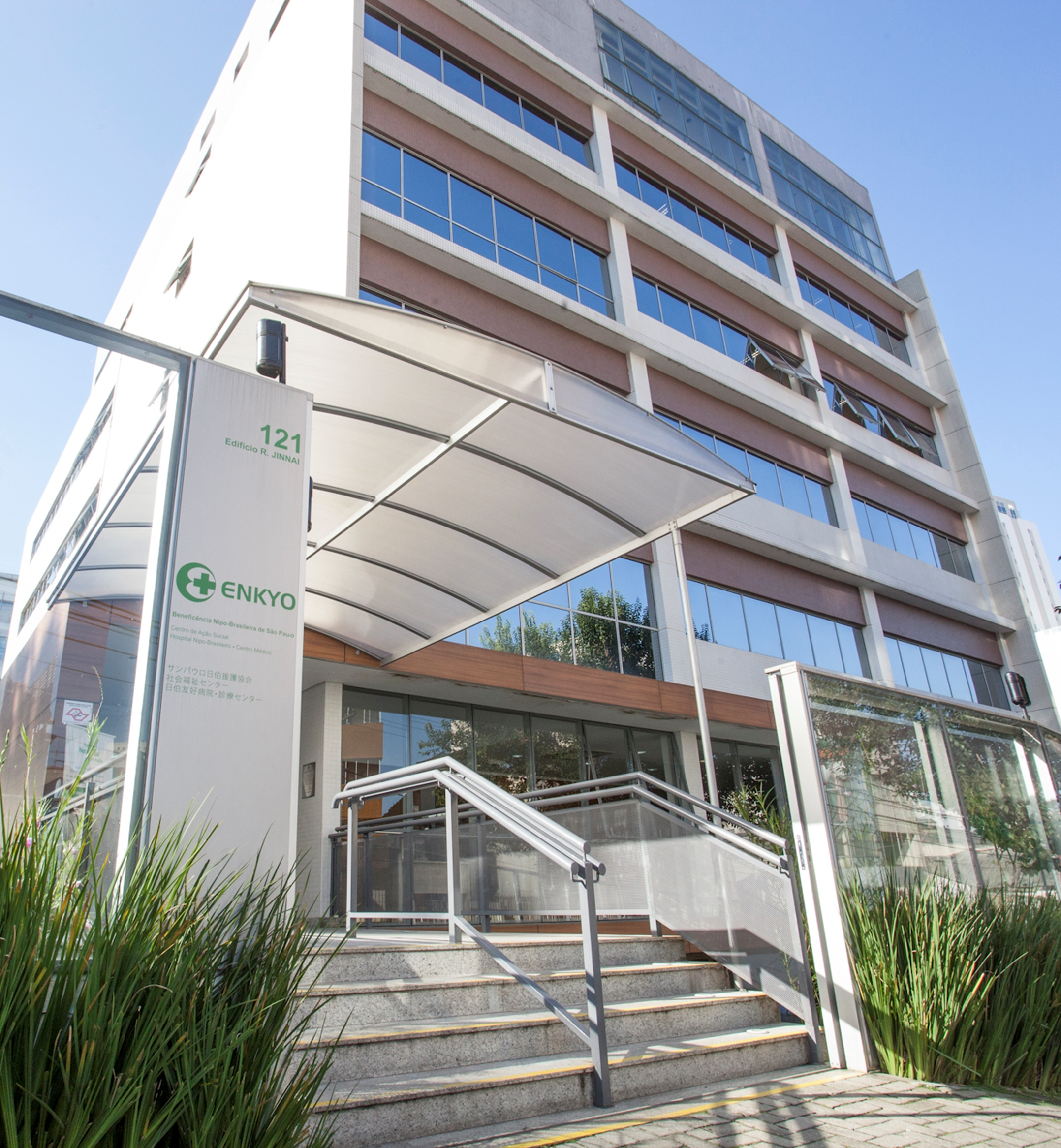
Building of the Beneficência Nipo-Brasileira de São Paulo.

Medical care was precarious when Japanese immigrants arrived in Brazil, and they faced difficulties with communication, failed to adapt to local conditions and consequently contracted diseases. This situation led the immigrants and the Japanese government to organize to improve and try to remedy the situation. An example of this mobilization was the creation of the Santa Cruz Hospital in São Paulo, inaugurated in 1939 with five floors, a basement, and almost 10,000 square meters of built area.

The creation of the Dōjinkai, an entity responsible for the health and well-being of Japanese immigrants in Brazil, was also important. The Japanese government sent doctors to Brazil to attend to the immigrants, but they were not enough to attend to the entire population. In addition to the precarious service, in the case of the Japanese, this problem was aggravated by the lack of understanding of the Portuguese language.

In 1959, the Associação de Assistência aos Imigrantes Japoneses was founded, which changed its name to Beneficência Nipo-Brasileira de São Paulo in 1972, which aimed to offer social, moral and material assistance to immigrants who, in some way, present vulnerability and social risk. In the Nikkei community, it is known as Enkyo. The institution maintains the Nipo-Brasileiro Hospital, which was founded in 1988 in commemoration of the 80th anniversary of Japanese immigration, with the presence of Prince Fumihito and the then President of the Republic, José Sarney at the inauguration. The cost of the hospital was divided between funds sent by the Japanese government and funds raised in Brazil through contributions from members of the Japanese community, donations from legal entities and Enkyo funds.

In addition to the Nipo-Brasileiro Hospital, the Beneficência Nipo-Brasileira de São Paulo maintains other institutions that support the general population, such as the São Miguel Arcanjo Hospital, located in the city of São Miguel Arcanjo, founded in 2013. Other examples are the Guarulhos Orthopedic and Rehabilitation Clinic, located in Guarulhos, the Liberdade Medical Center, in São Paulo capital, and the Mobile Medical Assistance, which aims to provide medical assistance, performing consultations and exams to people in the Metropolitan Region of São Paulo and cities in the interior of the state, in addition to raising awareness and guiding the public served on chronic diseases, health and nutrition. Beneficência also maintains a project for autistic children called Pro-Autistic Integration Project, a treatment center for people with mental disorders, the Yassuragui Home, in Guarulhos, and also several retirement homes in various locations in the state of São Paulo.

The Beneficência Nipo-Brasileira da Amazônia is an institution created in 1965 that maintains the Amazônia Hospital, located in Belém, the Amazônia de Quatro-Bocas Hospital in Tomé-Açu, and the Social Rehabilitation Center, in Ananindeua, which is a retirement home that serves more than a hundred elderly people.

Currently, in Brazil there are approximately 14,000 Japanese descendants working as doctors, and several doctors of Japanese descent have excelled in Brazilian medicine, such as the cardiovascular surgeon Seigo Tsuzuki who was Minister of Health in the Sarney government. There was also the contribution of the medical inventor Kentaro Takaoka, who invented the Takaoka respirator in 1955. In 2005, he received the Finep Inventor Innovator Trophy from President Luiz Inácio Lula da Silva.

There is also the case of Nikkei psychiatrists who have become prominent in the area in which they work in Brazil, such as Içami Tiba, who has also published books. Tiba was a lecturer in several countries, performed tens of thousands of psychotherapeutic consultations, and also participated frequently in several programs on television and radio. Another recognized psychiatrist is Roberto Shinyashiki, who has written several best-selling books on career, happiness and success. In addition, Shinyashiki lectures both in Brazil and abroad, is an organizational consultant and has taught specialization courses in the US, Europe and Japan.

== See also ==
- Brazilians in Japan
- Asian Brazilians
- Shindo Renmei
- Historical Museum of Japanese Immigration in Brazil
