= Japanese Brazilians =

Ethnic group

Nipo-brasileiros (Portuguese) 日系ブラジル人 (Japanese)
- (Japan) (Brazil)
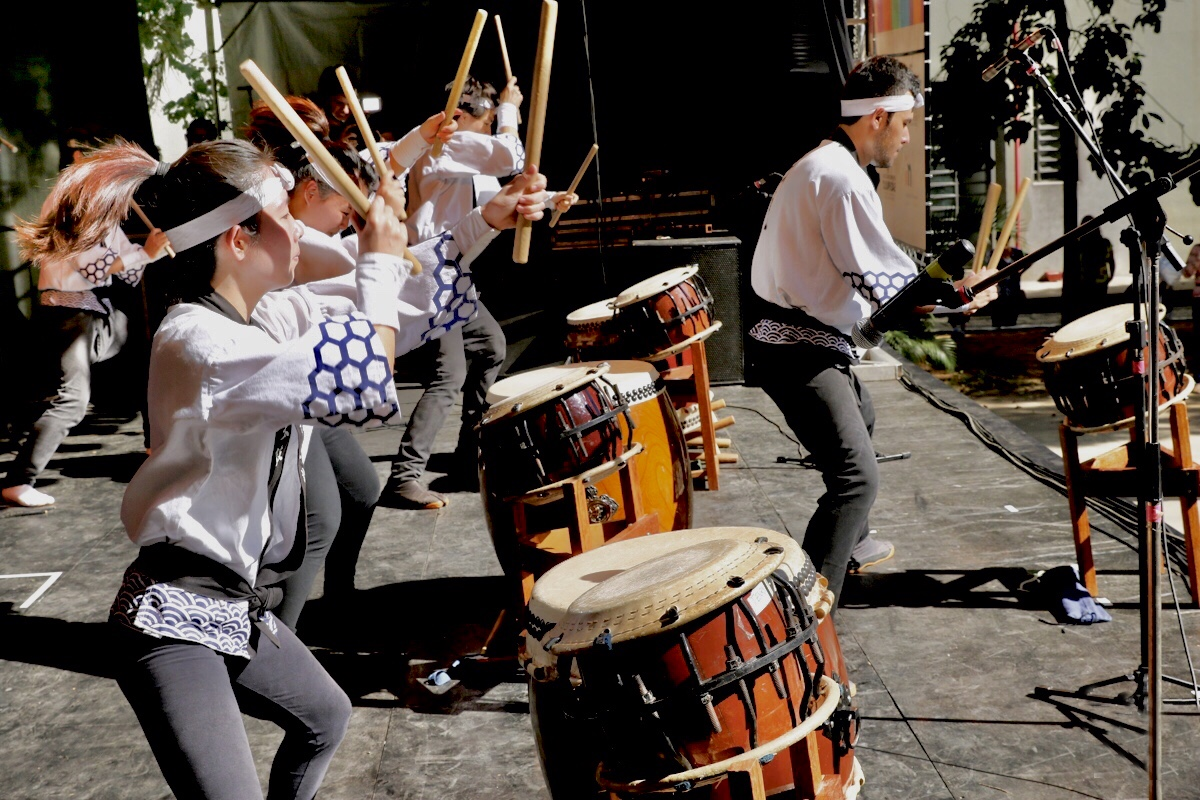
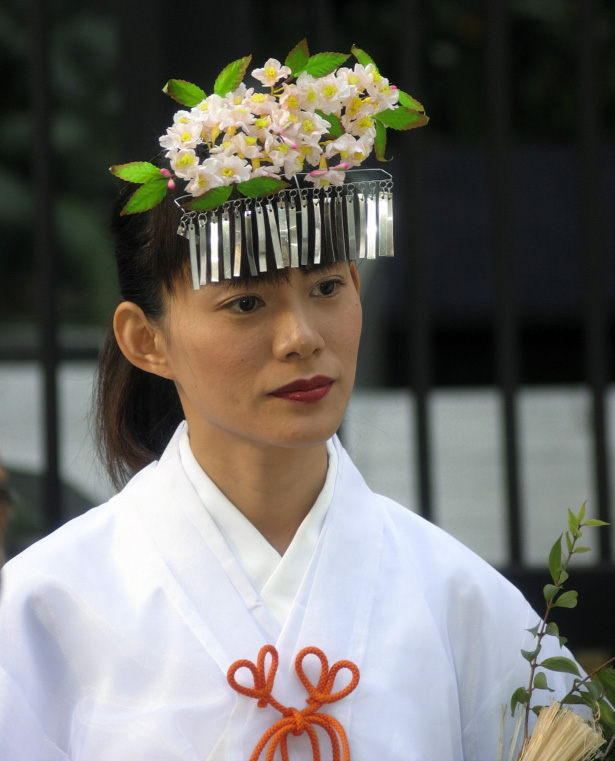
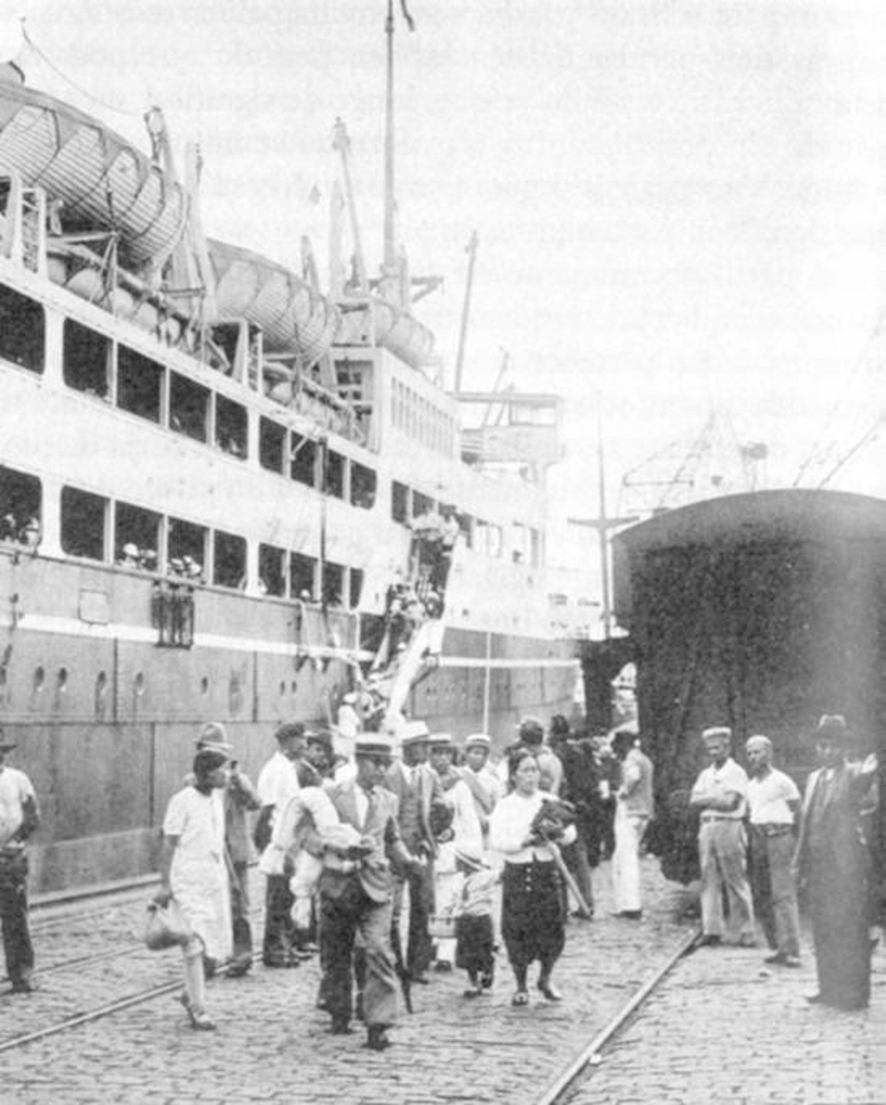
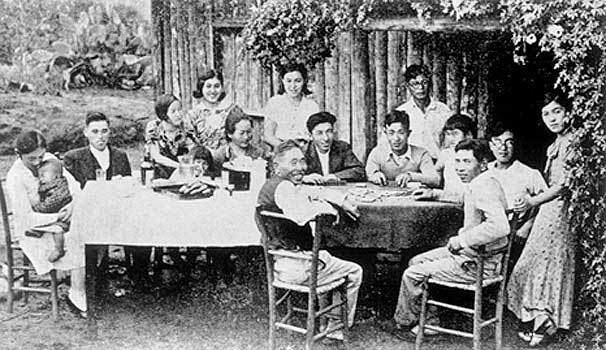
- Japanese Brazilians in São Paulo at a traditional festival A Japanese Brazilian miko during a festival in Curitiba Japanese immigrants arriving to the Port of Santos (c. 1937) Japanese family in Bastos, São Paulo (c. 1930)

Total population
- 46,900 Japanese citizens living in Brazil (2023); ~2 million Brazilian nationals of Japanese descent living in Brazil (about 1% of the Brazilian population, 2022).

Regions with significant populations
- Japan: 211,840 (2023) Brazilian citizens living in Japan (most of whom are of Japanese descent). 0.2% of Japan's population

Languages
- Portuguese • Japanese

Religion
- Predominantly: Roman Catholicism; Minority: Buddhism and Shintoism; Japanese new religions Protestantism

Related ethnic groups
- Japanese, other nikkei groups (mainly those from Latin America and Japanese Americans), Latin Americans in Japan, Asian Latin Americans

Japanese Brazilians (Note: Nikkei Burajiru-jin (Japanese: 日系ブラジル人; Portuguese: Nipo-brasileiros, [ˌnipobɾaziˈle(j)ɾus])) are Brazilian citizens who are nationals or naturals of Japanese ancestry or Japanese immigrants living in Brazil. Japanese immigration to Brazil peaked between 1908 and 1960, with the highest concentration between 1926 and 1935. In 2022, Japan's Ministry of Foreign Affairs stated that there were 2 million Japanese descendants in Brazil, making it the country with the largest population of Japanese origin outside Japan. However, in terms of Japanese citizens, Brazil ranked seventh in 2023, with 46,900 Japanese citizens. (Note: "In 2023, 414,620 Japanese lived in the United States, 101,790 in China, 99,830 in Australia, 75,110 in Canada, 72,310 in Thailand, and 64,970 in the United Kingdom.) Most of the Japanese-descendant population in Brazil has been living in the country for three or more generations and most only hold Brazilian citizenship. Nikkei is the term used to refer to Japanese people and their descendants.

Japanese immigration to Brazil officially began on June 18, 1908, when the ship Kasato Maru docked at Porto de Santos, bringing 781 Japanese workers to the coffee plantations in the São Paulo state countryside. For this reason, June 18 was established as the national day of Japanese immigration. Immigration to Brazil ceased by 1973, with the arrival of the last immigrant ship, the Nippon Maru. Between 1908 and 1963, 242,171 Japanese immigrants arrived in Brazil, making them the fifth-largest immigrant group after Portuguese, Italian, Spanish, and German immigrants. (Note: Entre 1820 e 1963, entraram no Brasil 5.527.354 imigrantes, dos quais 1.767.334 portugueses, 1.624.725 italianos, 712.957 espanhóis, 256.566 alemães e 242.171 japoneses.) Currently, most Japanese Brazilians live in the states of São Paulo and Paraná.

In the early 20th century, Japan was overpopulated relative to its infrastructure, and its predominantly rural population experienced significant poverty. At the same time, the Brazilian government was encouraging immigration, especially to supply labor for coffee plantations in São Paulo. Coffee was Brazil's main export product, and the country's financial health relied on it. Much of the labor on Brazilian coffee plantations came from Italian immigrants, whose passage by ship was subsidized by the Brazilian government. However, in 1902, the Italian government issued the Prinetti Decree, which banned subsidized immigration to Brazil due to reports that Italian immigrants were being exploited as laborers on Brazilian farms. Consequently, the São Paulo government sought new sources of labor from other countries, including Japan, and Japanese immigration to Brazil developed in this context.

Labor contracts on coffee plantations required immigrants to work for five years, but conditions were so poor that many left within the first year. Through great effort, some Japanese workers managed to save enough to buy their own land, with the first Japanese land purchase occurring in 1911 in the São Paulo countryside. Over the decades, Japanese immigrants and their descendants gradually moved from rural areas to Brazilian cities. By the early 1960s, the Japanese Brazilian urban population had surpassed the rural one. Many Japanese immigrants began working in small businesses or providing basic services. In Japanese tradition, the eldest son would continue the family business to help support his younger siblings' education. By 1958, Japanese and their descendants, though less than 2% of the Brazilian population, accounted for 21% of Brazilians with education beyond high school. A 2016 IPEA study found that Japanese descendants had the highest average educational and salary levels in Brazil. With Brazil's economic deterioration from the late 1980s, many Japanese descendants from Brazil began migrating to Japan, in search of better economic conditions. These individuals are known as Dekasegis.

== History ==
=== Background ===
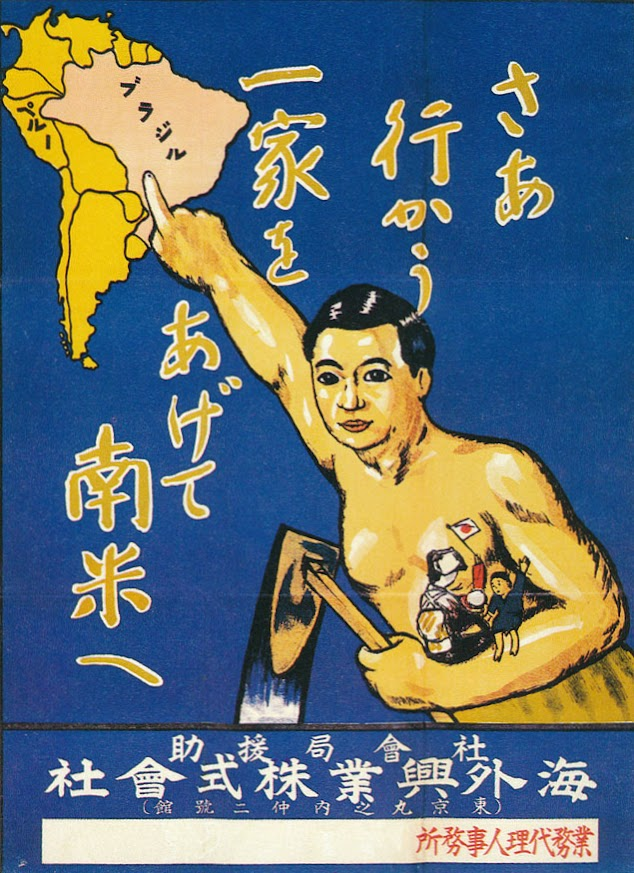
A poster used in Japan to attract immigrants to Brazil and Peru. It reads: "Let's go to South America (Brazil highlighted) with your entire family."

Between the end of the 19th and early 20th centuries, coffee was the main export product of Brazil. At first, Brazilian farmers used African slave labour in the coffee plantations, but in 1850, the slave trade was abolished in Brazil. To solve the labour shortage, the Brazilian elite decided to attract European immigrants to work on the coffee plantations. This was also consistent with the government's push towards "whitening" the country. The hope was that through procreation the large African and Native American groups would be eliminated or reduced. The government and farmers offered to pay European immigrants' passage. The plan encouraged millions of Europeans, most of them Italians, to migrate to Brazil. However, once in Brazil, the immigrants received very low salaries and worked in poor conditions, including long working hours and frequent ill-treatment by their bosses. Because of this, in 1902, Italy enacted the Prinetti Decree, prohibiting subsidized emigration to Brazil.

Japan had been isolated from the rest of the world during the 265 years of the Edo period (Tokugawa Shogunate), without wars or epidemics brought in from abroad. With its agricultural techniques of the time, Japan produced only the food it needed and had practically no formal stocks for difficult periods. Any agricultural crop failure caused widespread famine. The end of the Tokugawa Shogunate gave way to an intense project of modernization and opening to the outside world during the Meiji era. Despite the agrarian reform, mechanization of agriculture made thousands of peasants unemployed. Thousands of other small peasants became indebted or lost their land because they could not pay the high taxes.

The end of feudalism in Japan generated great poverty in the rural population, so many Japanese people began to emigrate in search of better living conditions. By the 1930s, Japanese industrialisation had significantly boosted the population. However, prospects for Japanese people to migrate to other countries were limited. The United States had banned non-white immigration from some parts of the world on the basis that they would not integrate into society; this Exclusion clause, of the 1924 Immigration Act, specifically targeted the Japanese. At the same time in Australia, the White Australia policy prevented the immigration of non-whites to Australia.

=== First immigrants ===
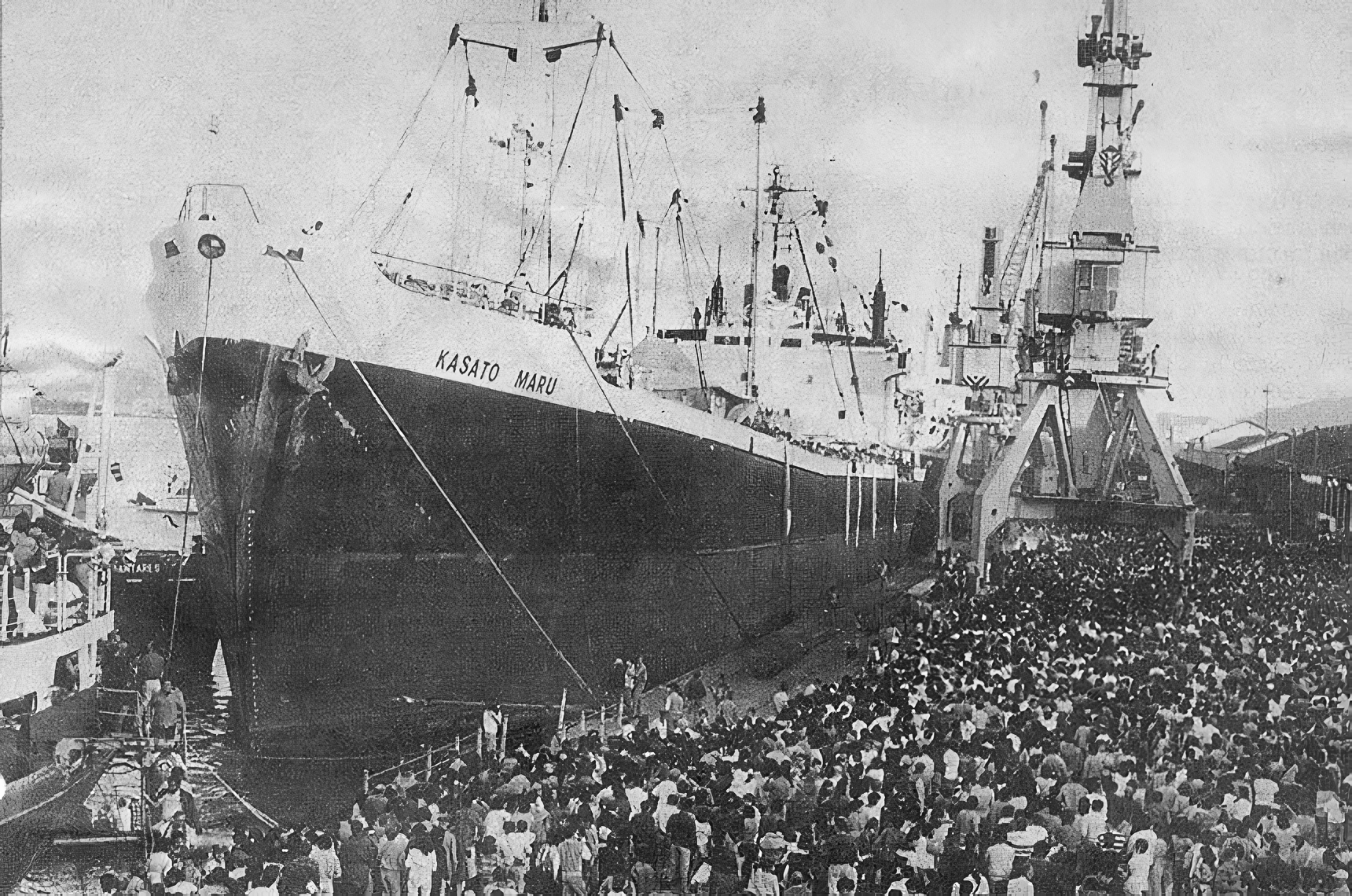
The Kasato Maru docked in Port of Santos, 1908

In 1907, the Brazilian and the Japanese governments signed a treaty permitting Japanese migration to Brazil. This was due in part to the decrease in the Italian immigration to Brazil and a new labour shortage on the coffee plantations. Also, Japanese immigration to the United States had been barred by the Gentlemen's Agreement of 1907. The first Japanese immigrants (781 people – mostly farmers) came to Brazil in 1908 on the Kasato Maru. About half of these immigrants were Okinawans from southern Okinawa, who had faced 29 years of oppression by the Japanese government following the Ryukyu Islands's annexation, becoming the first Ryukyuan Brazilians. They travelled from the Japanese port of Kobe via the Cape of Good Hope in South Africa. Many of them worked on coffee plantations.

In the first seven years, 3,434 more Japanese families (14,983 people) arrived. The beginning of World War I in 1914 started a boom in Japanese migration to Brazil. Between 1917 and 1940, over 164,000 Japanese came to Brazil, with 90% of them going to São Paulo, where most of the coffee plantations were located.

Japanese immigration to Brazil by period, 1906–1993
Years	Immigrants
1906–1910	1,714
1911–1915	13,371
1916–1920	13,576
1921–1925	11,350
1926–1930	59,564
1931–1935	72,661
1936–1941	16,750
1952–1955	7,715
1956–1960	29,727
1961–1965	9,488
1966–1970	2,753
1971–1975	1,992
1976–1980	1,352
1981–1985	411
1986–1990	171
1991–1993	48
Total	242,643

=== New life in Brazil ===
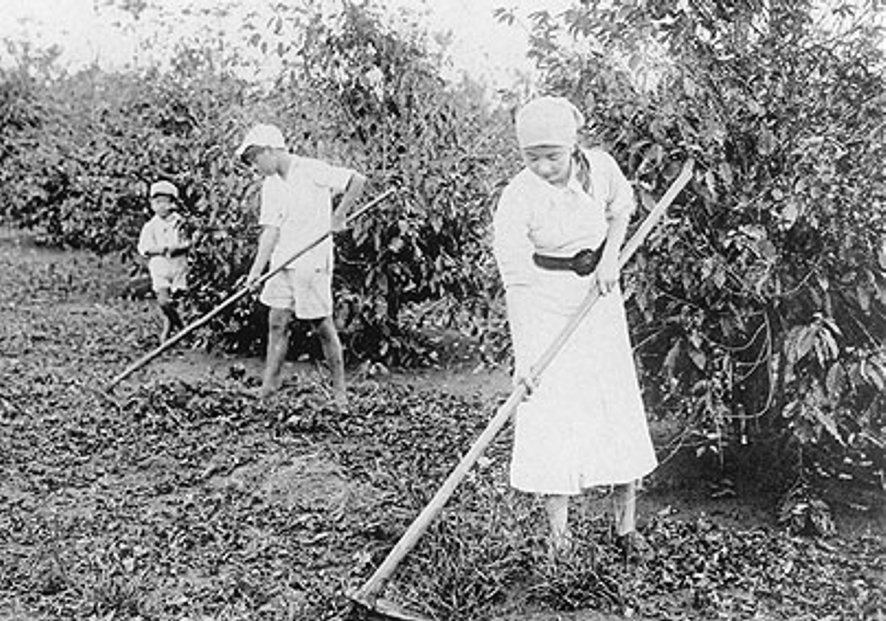
Japanese immigrants working on coffee plantation (c. 1930)

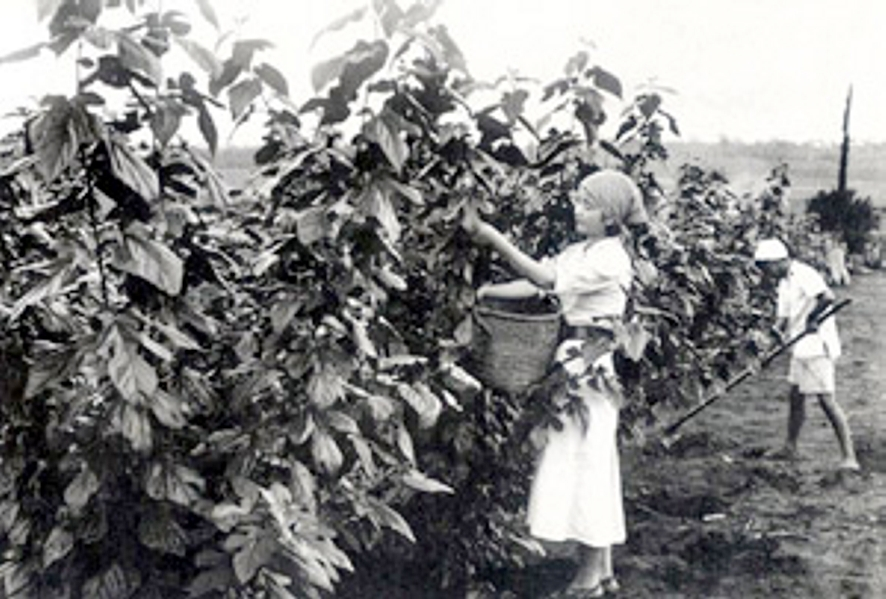
Japanese immigrants with silkworm breeding (c. 1930)

The vast majority of Japanese immigrants intended to work a few years in Brazil, make some money, and go home. However, "getting rich quick" was a dream that was almost impossible to achieve. This was exacerbated by the fact that it was obligatory for Japanese immigrants to Brazil prior to the Second World War to emigrate in familial units. Because multiple persons necessitated monetary support in these familial units, Japanese immigrants found it nearly impossible to return home to Japan even years after emigrating to Brazil. The immigrants were paid a very low salary and worked long hours of exhausting work. Also, everything that the immigrants consumed had to be purchased from the landowner (see truck system). Soon, their debts became very significant. Contrary to the plan, only 10% of the nearly 190,000 Japanese who immigrated to Brazil before the Second World War returned to Japan.

On August 1, 1908, The New York Times remarked that relations between Brazil and Japan at the time were "not extremely cordial", because of "the attitude of Brazil toward the immigration of Japanese labourers."

The landowners in Brazil still had a slavery mentality. Immigrants, although employees, had to confront the rigidity and lack of labour laws. Indebted and subjected to hours of exhaustive work, often suffering physical violence, suicide, yonige (to escape at night), and strikes were some of the attitudes taken by many Japanese because of the exploitation on coffee farms. Even when they were free of their contractual obligations on Brazil's coffee plantations, it was often impossible for immigrants to return home due to their meager earnings.

However, through a system called "partnership farming", in a contract with a landowner, in which the immigrants committed themselves to deforesting the land, sowing coffee, taking care of the plantation and returning the area in seven years' time, when the second harvest would be ready, the immigrants could keep the profits from the first harvest, taking into account that the coffee cultivation is biannual. They also kept everything they planted, in addition to coffee. In this way, many Japanese managed to save some money and buy their first pieces of land in Brazil. The first land purchase by the Japanese in Brazil took place in São Paulo, in 1911.

Many Japanese immigrants purchased land in rural Brazil, having been forced to invest what little capital they had into land in order to someday make enough to return to Japan. As independent farmers, Japanese immigrants formed communities that were ethnically isolated from the rest of Brazilian society. The immigrants who settled and formed these communities referred to themselves as shokumin and their settlements as shokuminchi. In 1940, the Superintendence of Coffee Business issued that even though the Japanese living in São Paulo made up only 3.5% of the state's population, they were responsible for 100% of the production of ramie, silk, peaches and strawberries; 99% of mint and tea; 80% of potatoes and vegetables; 70% of eggs; 50% of bananas; 40% of the cotton and 20% of the coffee produced by the state of São Paulo.

Japanese children born in Brazil were educated in schools founded by the Japanese community. Most only learned to speak the Japanese language and lived within the Japanese community in rural areas. Over the years, many Japanese managed to buy their own land and became small farmers. They started to plant strawberries, tea and rice. Only 6% of children were the result of interracial relationships. Immigrants rarely accepted marriage with a non-Japanese person.

By the 1930s, Brazilians complained that the independent Japanese communities had formed quistos raciais, or "racial cysts", and were unwilling to further integrate the Japanese Brazilians into Brazilian society. The Japanese government, via the Japanese consulate in São Paulo, was directly involved with the education of Japanese children in Brazil. Japanese education in Brazil was modeled after education systems in Japan, and schools in Japanese communities in Brazil received funding directly from the Japanese government. By 1933, there were 140,000–150,000 Japanese Brazilians, which was by far the largest Japanese population in any Latin American country.

With Brazil under the leadership of Getúlio Vargas and the Empire of Japan involved on the Axis side in World War II, Japanese Brazilians became more isolated from their mother country. Japanese leaders and diplomats in Brazil left for Japan after Brazil severed all relations with Japan on January 29, 1942, leading Japanese Brazilians to fend for themselves in an increasingly hostile country. Vargas's regime instituted several measures that targeted the Japanese population in Brazil, including the loss of freedom to travel within Brazil, censorship of Japanese newspapers (even those printed in Portuguese), and imprisonment if Japanese Brazilians were caught speaking Japanese in public. Japanese Brazilians became divided amongst themselves, and some even turned to performing terrorist acts on Japanese farmers who were employed by Brazilian farmers. By 1947, however, following the end of World War II, tensions between Brazilians and their Japanese population had cooled considerably. Japanese-language newspapers returned to publication and Japanese-language education was reinstituted among the Japanese Brazilian population. World War II had left Japanese Brazilians isolated from their mother country, censored by the Brazilian government, and facing internal conflicts within their own populations, but, for the most part, life returned to normal following the end of the war.

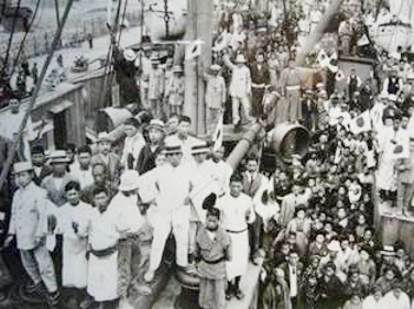
The first immigrants on the Kasato Maru ship (1908).

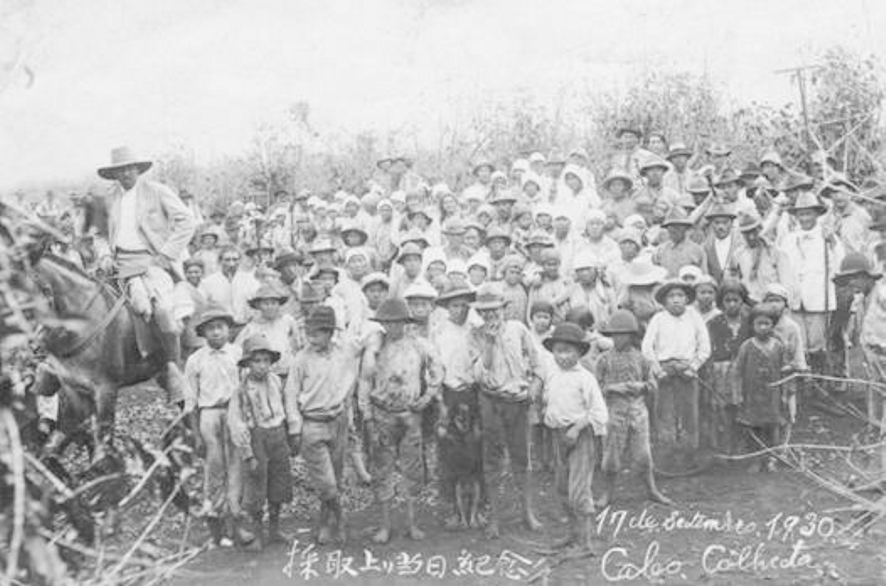
Japanese on coffee plantation (1930).

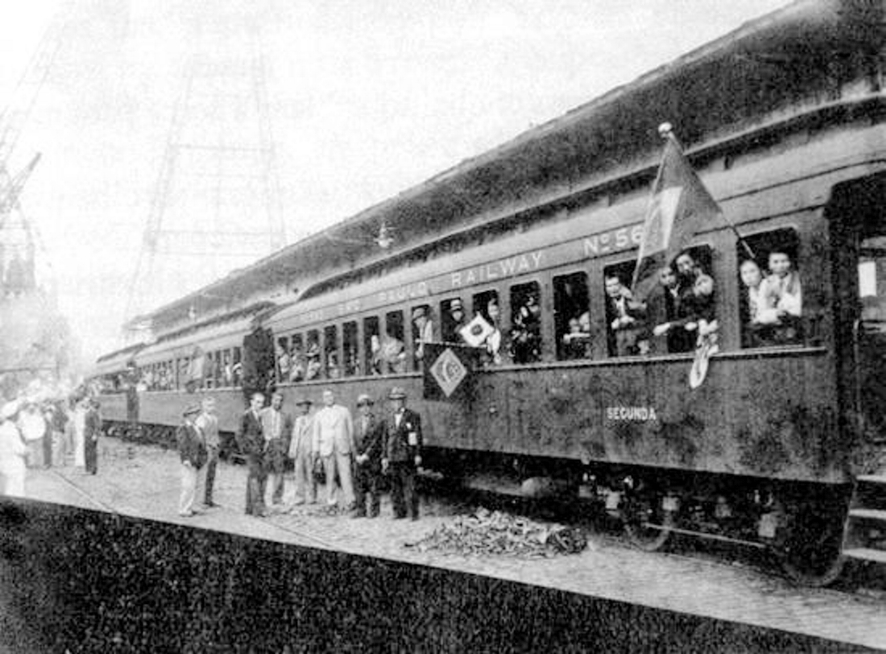
A train taking Japanese immigrants from Santos to São Paulo (1935).

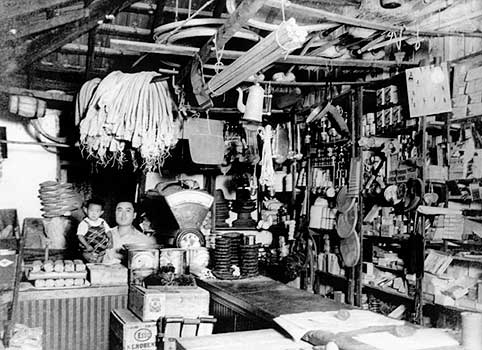
Japanese store in São Paulo (1940s).

=== Prejudice and forced assimilation ===
On July 28, 1921, representatives Andrade Bezerra and Cincinato Braga proposed a law whose Article 1 provided: "The immigration of individuals from the black race to Brazil is prohibited." On October 22, 1923, representative Fidélis Reis produced another bill on the entry of immigrants, whose fifth article was as follows: "The entry of settlers from the black race into Brazil is prohibited. For Asian [immigrants] there will be allowed each year a number equal to 5% of those residing in the country..."

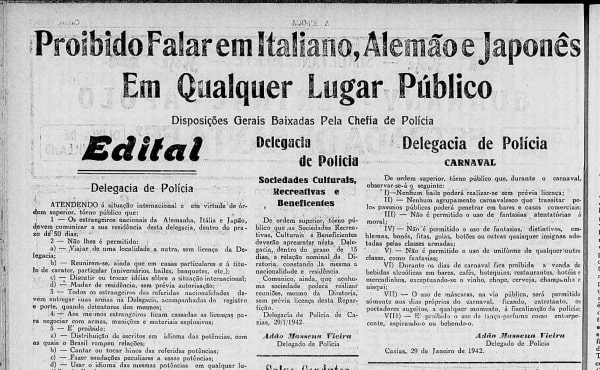
Caxias police notice from 1942, stating a ban on speaking Italian, German and Japanese in public, as well as other limitations on citizens of Italy, Germany and Japan.

Some years before World War II, the government of President Getúlio Vargas initiated a process of forced assimilation of people of immigrant origin in Brazil. The Constitution of 1934 had a legal provision about the subject: "The concentration of immigrants anywhere in the country is prohibited, the law should govern the selection, location and assimilation of the alien". The assimilationist project affected mainly Japanese, Italian, Jewish, and German immigrants and their descendants.

The formation of "ethnic cysts" among immigrants of non-Portuguese origin prevented the realization of the whitening project of the Brazilian population. The government, then, started to act on these communities of foreign origin to force them to integrate into a "Brazilian culture" with Portuguese roots. It was the dominant idea of a unification of all the inhabitants of Brazil under a single "national spirit". During World War II, Brazil severed relations with Japan. Japanese newspapers and teaching the Japanese language in schools were banned, leaving Portuguese as the only option for Japanese descendants. Newspapers in Italian or German were also advised to cease production, as Italy and Germany were Japan's allies in the war. In 1939, research of Estrada de Ferro Noroeste do Brasil, from São Paulo, showed that 87.7% of Japanese Brazilians read newspapers in the Japanese language, a high figure for a country with many illiterate people like Brazil at the time.

The Japanese appeared as undesirable immigrants within the "whitening" and assimilationist policy of the Brazilian government. Oliveira Viana, a Brazilian jurist, historian and sociologist described the Japanese immigrants as follows: "They (Japanese) are like sulfur: insoluble". The Brazilian magazine "O Malho" in its edition of December 5, 1908, issued a charge of Japanese immigrants with the following legend: "The government of São Paulo is stubborn. After the failure of the first Japanese immigration, it contracted 3,000 yellow people. It insists on giving Brazil a race diametrically opposite to ours". In 1941, the Brazilian Minister of Justice, Francisco Campos, defended the ban on admission of 400 Japanese immigrants in São Paulo and wrote: "their despicable standard of living is a brutal competition with the country's worker; their selfishness, their bad faith, their refractory character, make them a huge ethnic and cultural cyst located in the richest regions of Brazil".

The Japanese Brazilian community was strongly marked by restrictive measures when Brazil declared war against Japan in August 1942. Japanese Brazilians could not travel the country without safe conduct issued by the police; over 200 Japanese schools were closed and radio equipment was seized to prevent transmissions on short wave from Japan. The goods of Japanese companies were confiscated and several companies of Japanese origin had interventions, including the newly founded Banco América do Sul. Japanese Brazilians were prohibited from driving motor vehicles (even if they were taxi drivers), buses or trucks on their property. The drivers employed by Japanese had to have permission from the police. Thousands of Japanese immigrants were arrested or expelled from Brazil on suspicion of espionage. There were many anonymous denunciations of "activities against national security" arising from disagreements between neighbors, recovery of debts and even fights between children. Japanese Brazilians were arrested for "suspicious activity" when they were in artistic meetings or picnics. On July 10, 1943, approximately 10,000 Japanese and German and Italian immigrants who lived in Santos had 24 hours to close their homes and businesses and move away from the Brazilian coast. The police acted without any notice. About 90% of people displaced were Japanese. To reside in Baixada Santista, the Japanese had to have a safe conduct. In 1942, the Japanese community who introduced the cultivation of pepper in Tomé-Açu, in Pará, was virtually turned into a "concentration camp". This time, the Brazilian ambassador in Washington, D.C., Carlos Martins Pereira e Sousa, encouraged the government of Brazil to transfer all the Japanese Brazilians to "internment camps" without the need for legal support, in the same manner as was done with the Japanese residents in the United States. No single suspicion of activities of Japanese against "national security" was confirmed.

During the National Constituent Assembly of 1946, the representative of Rio de Janeiro Miguel Couto Filho proposed Amendments to the Constitution as follows: "It is prohibited the entry of Japanese immigrants of any age and any origin in the country". In the final vote, a tie with 99 votes in favour and 99 against. Senator Fernando de Melo Viana, who chaired the session of the Constituent Assembly, had the casting vote and rejected the constitutional amendment. By only one vote, the immigration of Japanese people to Brazil was not prohibited by the Brazilian Constitution of 1946.

The Japanese immigrants appeared to the Brazilian government as undesirable and non-assimilable immigrants. As Asian, they did not contribute to the "whitening" process of the Brazilian people as desired by the ruling Brazilian elite. In this process of forced assimilation the Japanese, more than any other immigrant group, suffered the ethno-cultural persecution imposed during this period.

=== Prestige ===
Fábio Riodi Yassuda, a Nisei who became the first Brazilian minister of Japanese descent.

For decades, Japanese Brazilians were seen as a non-assimilable people. The immigrants were treated only as a reserve of cheap labour that should be used on coffee plantations and that Brazil should avoid absorbing their cultural influences. This widespread conception that the Japanese were negative for Brazil was changed in the following decades. The Japanese were able to overcome the difficulties along the years and drastically improve their lives through hard work and education; this was also facilitated by the involvement of the Japanese government in the process of migration. The image of hard working agriculturists that came to help develop the country and agriculture helped erase the lack of trust of the local population and create a positive image of the Japanese. In the 1970s, Japan became one of the richest countries of the world, synonymous with modernity and progress. In the same period, Japanese Brazilians achieved a great cultural and economic success, probably the immigrant group that most rapidly achieved progress in Brazil. Due to the powerful Japanese economy and due to the rapid enrichment of the Nisei, in the last decades Brazilians of Japanese descent achieved a social prestige in Brazil that largely contrasts with the aggression with which the early immigrants were treated in the country.

In the early 1960s, the Japanese Brazilian population in the cities already surpassed that of the countryside. As the vast majority of families that moved to São Paulo and cities in Paraná had few resources and were headed by first and second-generation Japanese, it was imperative that their business did not require a large initial investment or advanced knowledge of the Portuguese language. Thus, a good part of the immigrants began to dedicate themselves to small trade or to the provision of basic services, where dyeing stood out. In the 1970s, 80% of the 3,500 establishments that washed and ironed the clothes of São Paulo citizens were Japanese. According to anthropologist Célia Sakurai: "The business was convenient for the families, because they could live at the back of the dye shop and do all the work without having to hire employees. In addition, the communication required by the activity was brief and simple".

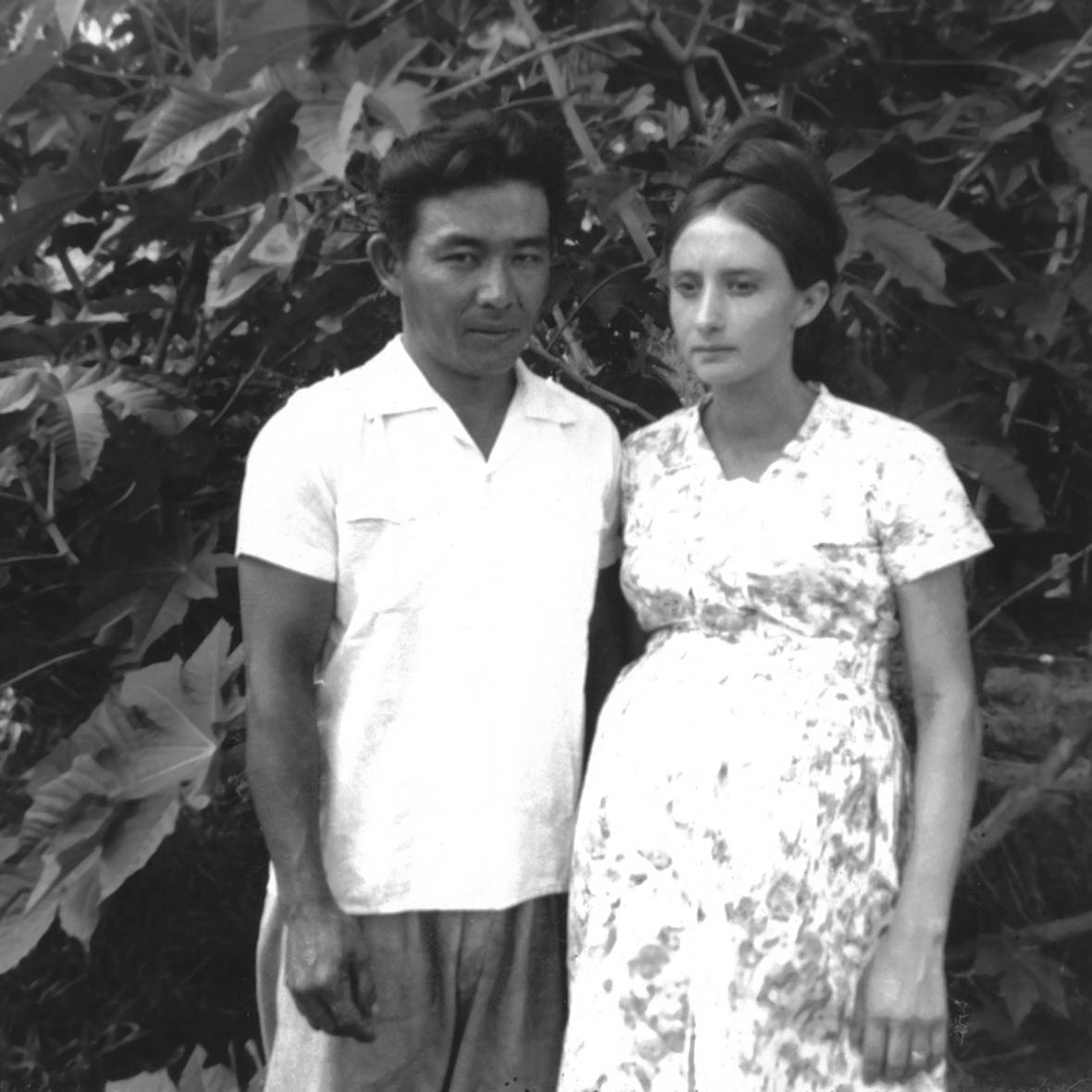
Inter-racial couple in Brazil; unusual during the '60s in rural areas.

In the Brazilian urban environment, the Japanese began to work mainly in sectors related to agriculture, such as traders or owners of small stores, selling fruit, vegetables or fish. Working with greengrocers and market stalls was facilitated by the contact that urban Japanese had with those who had stayed in the countryside, as suppliers were usually friends or relatives. Whatever the activity chosen by the family, it was up to the eldest children to work together with their parents. The custom was a Japanese tradition of delegating to the eldest son the continuation of the family activity and also the need to help pay for the studies of the younger siblings. While the older ones worked, the younger siblings enrolled in technical courses, such as Accountancy, mainly because it was easier to deal with numbers than with the Portuguese language. As for college, the Japanese favored engineering, medicine and law, which guaranteed money and social prestige. In 1958, Japanese descendants already represented 21% of Brazilians with education above secondary. In 1977, Japanese Brazilians, who made up 2.5% of the population of São Paulo, added up to 13% of those approved at the University of São Paulo, 16% of those who were admitted to the Technological Institute of Aeronautics (ITA) and 12% of those selected at the Getulio Vargas Foundation (FGV). According to a 1995 research conducted by Datafolha, 53% of adult Japanese Brazilians had a college degree, compared to only 9% of Brazilians in general.

According to the newspaper Gazeta do Povo, in Brazil "common sense is that Japanese descendants are studious, disciplined, do well at school, pass the admission exams more easily and, in most cases, have great affinity for the exact science careers". According to a 2009 survey carried out with data from the University of São Paulo and Unesp, even though Japanese descendants were 1.2% of the population of the city of São Paulo and made up less than 4% of those enrolled in the entrance exams, they were about 15% of those approved.

A 2017 survey revealed that Brazilians of Japanese descent are the wealthiest group in Brazil. The survey concluded that Brazilians with a Japanese surname are the ones who earn the most (73.40 reais per hour):

Salary of Brazilians, according to their last name and color.
Ethnic origin (based on last name and color/race)	Salary (in Brazilian real per hour)
Japanese	73.40
Italian	51.80
German	48.10
Eastern European	47.60
Iberian (whites)	33.90
Pardo (brown)	27.80
Black	26.50
Indigenous	26.10

== Integration and intermarriage ==
=== Assimilation into Brazilian society ===
The majority of Japanese immigrants who arrived before World War II did not intend to stay permanently in Brazil; they simply wanted to work for a few years, save money, and return to Japan. As a result, they did not care about assimilating into Brazilian society. The immigrants' children attended Japanese schools, in rural Brazil, where they learned not only the Japanese language but also how to be Japanese After World War II, Japan resurfaced as an economic dominant force, developing a reconstructed identity for the Japanese people in Brazil. The Nikkei were seen as the "common capitalist identity" and many children of immigrant farming communities travelled to the city of São Paulo to pursue liberal professions. In these schools, they studied Japan's history and geography but knew little about Brazil's history and geography. They tried to live as if they had never left Japan.

This pattern changed with Japan's defeat in World War II. At that time, many Japanese immigrants realized they were deeply rooted in Brazil and that returning to a war-ravaged Japan was no longer worth it. On the other hand, Japanese who immigrated to Brazil after the war arrived with different goals; having experienced the horrors of war, they aimed not to return to Japan but to make Brazil their new homeland. Consequently, Japanese immigrants who arrived after the war assimilated into Brazilian society more easily and tended not to transmit Japanese culture and language to their children as much as those who had arrived before the war.

Convinced that they would no longer return to Japan, Japanese immigrants changed their expectations for their children as well, and the community stopped condemning Nisei (Brazilian-born children of Japanese immigrants) who did not speak Japanese. However, even before World War II, many Japanese immigrants had realized they would not return to Japan, beginning the initial movement toward "Brazilianization." In the 1920s, many Japanese immigrants converted to Catholicism, Brazil's predominant religion. The godparents chosen by the Japanese were almost always Brazilians, thus creating a link with the Brazilian people.

Successive generations of Japanese descendants, Sansei (third generation) and Yonsei (fourth generation), showed a greater degree of assimilation into Brazilian society than the Nisei (second generation), as the latter remained more immersed in their parents' Japanese culture compared to later generations, who were increasingly integrated into Brazilian culture.

However, "Brazilianization" did not mean a complete abandonment of Japanese values and traditions by the descendants. Japanese influence continued to manifest in various aspects, such as cuisine. Other values preserved by the descendants included an emphasis on discipline and education. According to a IBGE publication:

A large part of the new generations does not speak Japanese. Rarely, however, is there an absence among the descendants of certain strong traditional values, such as the spirit of Bushido, the warrior's sense of self-control. These are teachings passed down by Meiji-era immigrants that have shaped the conduct of later generations in their approach to work and family, and in some way have helped create the image of Japanese descendants as "studious," "intelligent," and "disciplined."

Despite assimilating into Brazilian society, even today Brazilians of Japanese descent are often not perceived as fully Brazilian and continue to be called – and to call themselves — "Japanese," even though many are third or fourth generation in Brazil, have never set foot in Japan, do not speak Japanese, and do not hold Japanese citizenship. Thus, being "Japanese" in Brazil has little to do with nationality or culture but rather with physical traits. Brazilian society was historically formed by Indigenous, European, and African peoples and the miscegenation of these three groups. Therefore, what is conventionally considered "Brazilian physical appearance" was inherited from these three origins. In Brazil, no one questions that a Black person could be Brazilian, nor that the child of Italian or Spanish immigrants is also Brazilian. By contrast, descendants of Japanese people, because of their physical features reminiscent of the Asian country from which their ancestors came, carry the distinction of continuing to be seen as "Japanese" in the country where they were born. This occurs even among people of mixed heritage, or those who have only one Japanese parent. Mixed-heritage individuals who inherit more Japanese features continue to be labeled "Japanese," while those with more non-Japanese features are more easily seen as "Brazilian." Even individuals with origins in other countries of the Far East, such as China and Korea, are often called "Japanese" in Brazil. Ultimately, physical appearance, rather than nationality or culture, defines someone as "Japanese" in Brazil.

This differentiation is often reinforced by the descendants of Japanese themselves, as they may refer to other Brazilians as "Brazilian" or "gaijin" (foreigner, in Japanese), associating Brazilian identity with negative aspects, such as trickery and laziness. Yet, when they go to Japan, Brazilians of Japanese descent realize they are not considered Japanese, as they are not seen as such by native Japanese, shattering the illusion that they are "Japanese." Thus, Japanese Brazilians experience a duality, being regarded as "Japanese" in Brazil but as "Brazilians" in Japan.

=== Generations and intermarriage ===
Intermarriage in the Japanese Brazilian community (data from 1987)
Generation	Denomination in		Proportion of each generation in all community (%)	Proportion of mixed-race in each generation (%)
Generation	Japanese	English	Proportion of each generation in all community (%)	Proportion of mixed-race in each generation (%)
1st	Issei	Immigrants	12.51%	0%
2nd	Nisei	Children	30.85%	6%
3rd	Sansei	Grandchildren	41.33%	42%
4th	Yonsei	Great-grandchildren	12.95%	61%

As of 1987, many Japanese Brazilians belonged to the third generation (sansei), who made up 41.33% of the community. First generation (issei) were 12.51%, second generation (nisei) were 30.85% and fourth generation (yonsei) 12.95%.

A census conducted in the late 1950s, with around 400,000 members of the Japanese Brazilian community, revealed that marriages between Japanese and non-Japanese represented less than 2% among first-generation immigrants and less than 6% in the whole Japanese Brazilian community. Japanese immigrants rarely married a non-Japanese person; however, their descendants, starting from the second and third generations, increasingly began to marry people of non-Japanese origin. By 1989, the rate of interethnic marriage was 45.9%.

By 1987, most Japanese Brazilians were still of full Japanese descent, with 28% having some non-Japanese ancestry. Only 6% of second-generation Japanese Brazilians (children) were mixed-race, but 42% of third-generation (grandchildren) were mixed and a majority of 61% of fourth-generation (great-grandchildren) were mixed.

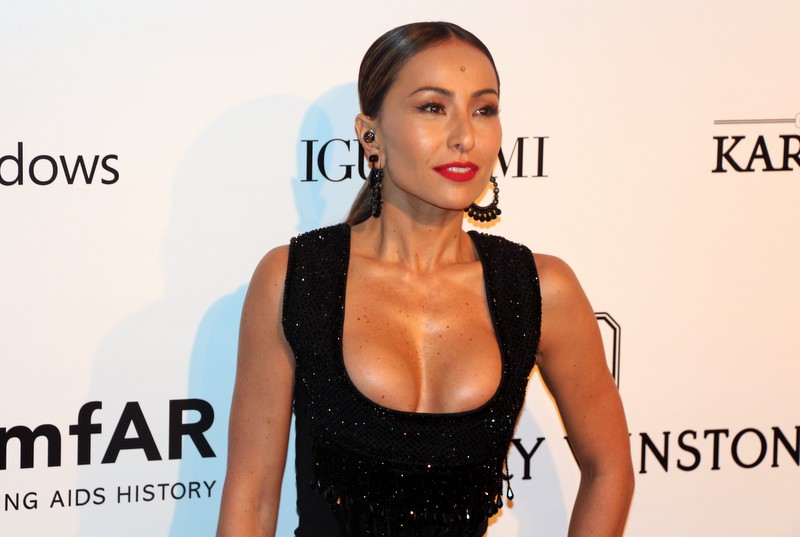
Brazilian television presenter Sabrina Sato is the granddaughter of Japanese on her mother's side, and of a Swiss and a Lebanese on her father's side. By 1987, 42% of third-generation Japanese Brazilians were of mixed heritage.

Most of the fourth-generation Japanese Brazilians no longer have significant ties with the Japanese community. According to a 2008 study, only 12% of fourth-generation people lived with their grandparents and only 0.4% of them lived with their great-grandparents. In the past generations, many Japanese Brazilians lived in the countryside and it was common for at least three generations to live together, thus preserving Japanese culture. In a rural environment, the proximity between community members and the strength of family relationships meant that Japanese traditions remained more alive. However, over 90% of fourth-generation Japanese Brazilians live in urban areas, where relationships are generally more impersonal, and they tend to assimilate Brazilian customs more than Japanese ones.

Some Japanese habits, however, resist – and culinary habits are among the most stubborn, as shown by a 2002 survey, which highlighted the influence of culture of origin on Nikkei students at the Federal University of Paraná (a third of them, yonsei). According to this study, although Brazilian dishes predominate on the menu of members of the fourth generation, they maintain the habit of frequently eating gohan (Japanese white rice, without seasoning) and consuming soy sauce, greens and vegetables cooked in the traditional way. The research also showed that the majority of the fourth generation do not speak Japanese, but understand basic domestic words and expressions. Some practices linked to the cult of ancestors, one of the pillars of Buddhism and Shintoism, also survive: many of them keep the butsudan at home, an altar on which photos of the family's dead are placed, to whom relatives offer water, food and prayers.

In 2005, a boy named Enzo Yuta Nakamura Onishi was the first sixth-generation person of Japanese descent to be born in Brazil. By 2022, less than 5% of Brazil's Japanese-origin population was Japanese-born (down from 12.51% in 1987), given that Japanese immigration to Brazil practically ceased in the 1970s.

=== Religion ===
Immigrants, as well as most Japanese, were mostly followers of Shinto and Buddhism. In the Japanese communities in Brazil, there was a strong effort by Brazilian priests to proselytize the Japanese. More recently, intermarriage with Catholics also contributed to the growth of Catholicism in the community. Currently, 60% of Japanese-Brazilians are Roman Catholics and 25% are adherents of a Japanese religion.

=== Martial arts ===
The Japanese immigration to Brazil, in particular the immigration of the judoka Mitsuyo Maeda, resulted in the development of one of the most effective modern martial arts, Brazilian Jiu-Jitsu. Japanese immigrants also brought sumo wrestling to Brazil, with the first tournament in the country organized in 1914. The country has a growing number of amateur sumo wrestlers, with the only purpose-built sumo arena outside Japan located in São Paulo. Brazil also produced (as of January 2022) sixteen professional wrestlers, with the most successful being Kaisei Ichirō.

=== Language ===
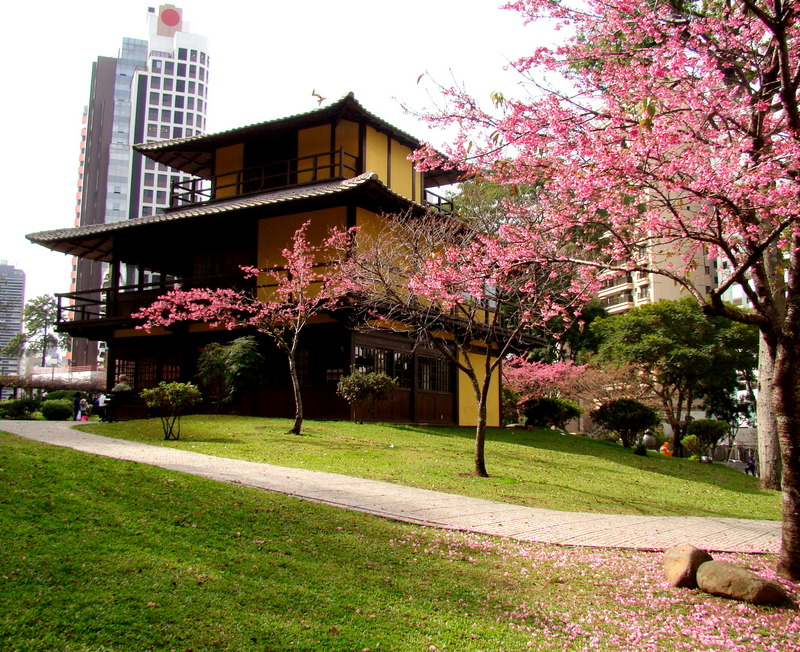
Cherry blossom in Japan's Square in Curitiba, Paraná.

The knowledge of the Japanese and Portuguese languages reflects the integration of the Japanese in Brazil over several generations. Although first generation immigrants will often not learn Portuguese well or not use it frequently, most second generation are bilingual. The third generation, however, are most likely monolingual in Portuguese or speak, along with Portuguese, non-fluent Japanese.

A study conducted in the Japanese Brazilian communities of Aliança and Fukuhaku, both in the state of São Paulo, released information on the language spoken by these people. Before coming to Brazil, 12.2% of the first generation interviewed from Aliança reported they had studied the Portuguese language in Japan, and 26.8% said to have used it once on arrival in Brazil. Many of the Japanese immigrants took classes of Portuguese and learned about the history of Brazil before migrating to the country. In Fukuhaku only 7.7% of the people reported they had studied Portuguese in Japan, but 38.5% said they had contact with Portuguese once on arrival in Brazil. All the immigrants reported they spoke exclusively Japanese at home in the first years in Brazil. However, in 2003, the figure dropped to 58.5% in Aliança and 33.3% in Fukuhaku. This probably reflects that through contact with the younger generations of the family, who speak mostly Portuguese, many immigrants also began to speak Portuguese at home.

The first Brazilian-born generation, the Nisei, alternate between the use of Portuguese and Japanese. Regarding the use of Japanese at home, 64.3% of Nisei informants from Aliança and 41.5% from Fukuhaku used Japanese when they were children. In comparison, only 14.3% of the third generation, Sansei, reported to speak Japanese at home when they were children. It reflects that the second generation was mostly educated by their Japanese parents using the Japanese language. On the other hand, the third generation did not have much contact with their grandparent's language, and most of them speak the national language of Brazil, Portuguese, as their mother tongue.

Japanese Brazilians usually speak Japanese more often when they live along with a first generation relative. Those who do not live with a Japanese-born relative usually speak Portuguese more often. Japanese spoken in Brazil is usually a mix of different Japanese dialects, since the Japanese community in Brazil came from all regions of Japan, influenced by the Portuguese language. The high numbers of Brazilian immigrants returning from Japan will probably produce more Japanese speakers in Brazil.

=== Demographics ===
==== 20th century ====
In 1934, there were 131,639 Japanese immigrants living in Brazil, of whom 10,828 lived in urban areas and 120,811 in the countryside. In Brazil's 1940 census, 144,523 Japanese immigrants were counted, more than 91% of whom were in the state of São Paulo. In the 1950 census, 129,192 Japanese were recorded, with 84.3% in São Paulo and 11.9% in Paraná. The data is shown in the table below:

Distribution of immigrants from Japan, natives and Brazilians, by Federative Units – 1940/1950
Federative Unit	Absolute Data		Proportions (%)	
Federative Unit	1940	1950	1940	1950
Pernambuco	636	836	0.351	0.456
Pará	467	421	0.323	0.326
Minas Gerais	893	917	0.618	0.710
Rio de Janeiro	380	1,086	0.263	0.841
Federal District	538	392	0.372	0.303
São Paulo	132,216	108,912	91.484	84.302
Paraná	8,064	15,393	5.580	11.915
Mato Grosso do Sul	1,128	1,172	0.780	0.907
Brazil	144,523	129,192	100	100

The maximum number of Japanese residents in Brazil was recorded in the 1970 census: 154,000. The states with at least one thousand Japanese residents were: São Paulo (116,566), Paraná (20,644), Mato Grosso (3,466), Pará (3,349), Rio Grande do Sul (1,619), Rio de Janeiro (1,451), Minas Gerais (1,406), and Guanabara (1,380). Since Japanese immigration to Brazil practically ceased in the 1970s, by 2022 less than 5% of Brazil's Japanese-origin population was Japanese-born, with over 95% being Brazilians whose Japanese ancestors immigrated to Brazil over the last five generations.

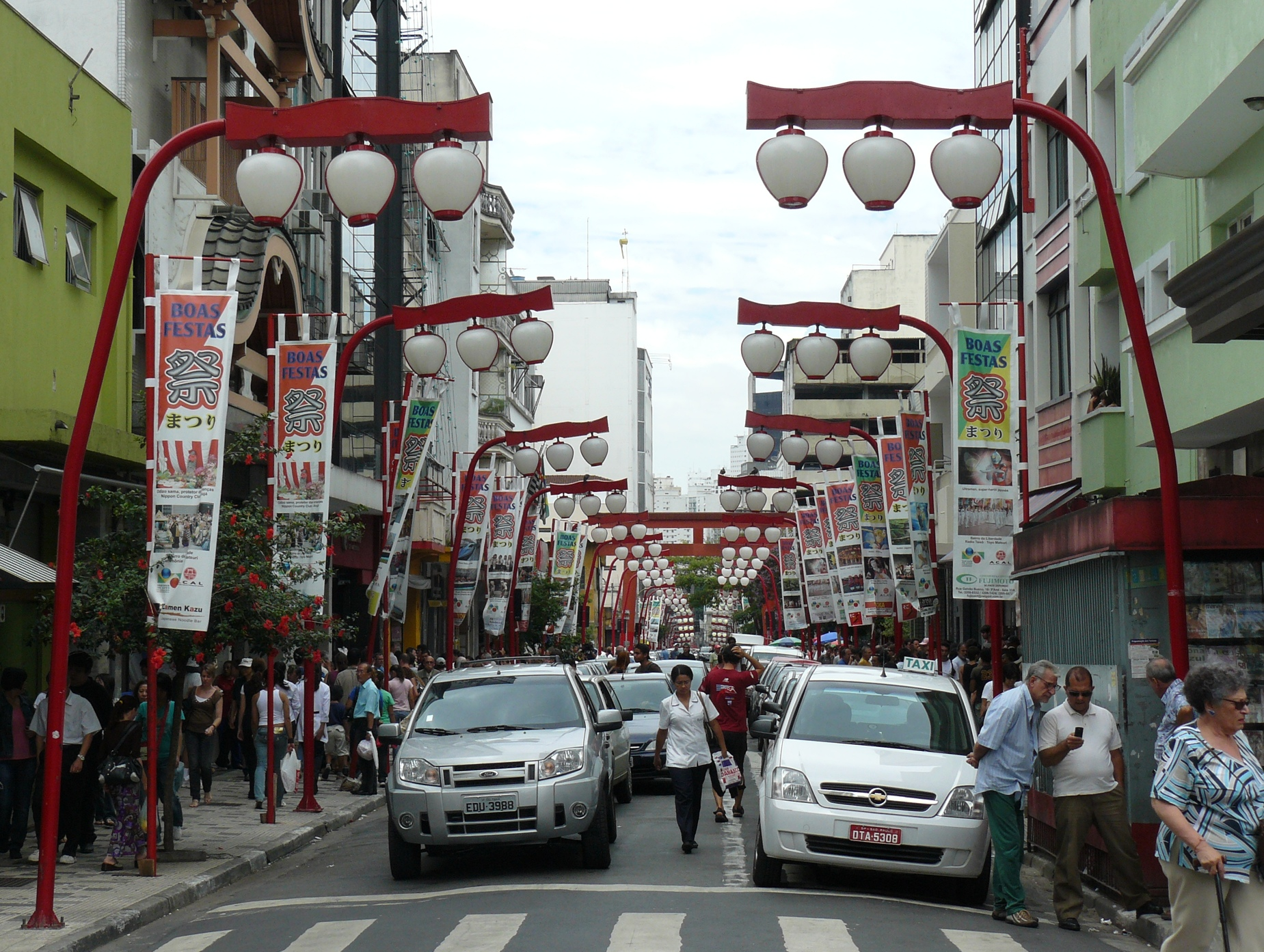
Liberdade neighborhood, in São Paulo city. As of 1988, there were 290,000 people of Japanese origin living in the city, the largest number in Brazil. São Paulo's Japanese influence is more visible in the Liberdade region.

According to a publication by the Japanese-Brazilian Studies Center in 1988, there were 1,167,000 Japanese descendants in Brazil that year, of whom 290,000, or 24.8%, lived in the city of São Paulo, 156,000 (13.3%) in the Greater São Paulo area, and 382,000 (32.7%) in the rest of the state of São Paulo. Thus, 70.8% of the Japanese Brazilian population, or 828,000 people, lived in São Paulo state. In southern Brazil, mainly in Paraná, there were 142,000 Japanese descendants, or 12.2% of the total.

==== 21st century ====
In 2008, IBGE published a book about the Japanese diaspora and it estimated that, as of 2000 there were 70,932 Japanese-born immigrants living in Brazil (compared to the 158,087 found in 1970). Of the Japanese, 51,445 lived in São Paulo. Most of the immigrants were over 60 years old, because the Japanese immigration to Brazil has ended since the mid-20th century. By 2023, the number of Japanese citizens living in Brazil had dropped further to 46,900.

A 2008 census revealed details about the population of Japanese origin from the city of Maringá in Paraná, making it possible to have a profile of the Japanese-Brazilian population. There were 4,034 families of Japanese descent from Maringá, comprising 14,324 people. Of the 12,478 people of Japanese origin living in Maringá, 6.61% were Issei (born in Japan); 35.45% were Nisei (children of Japanese); 37.72% were Sansei (grandchildren) and 13.79% were Yonsei (great-grandchildren). 47% could understand, read and write in Japanese. 31% of the second generation and 16% of the third generation could speak Japanese. A total of 20% were mixed-race (have some non-Japanese origin).

Throughout Brazil, with more than 1.4 million people of Japanese descent, the highest percentages were found in the states of São Paulo (1.9% of Japanese descendants), Paraná (1.5%), and Mato Grosso do Sul (1.4%). The lowest percentages were found in Roraima and Alagoas (with only 8 Japanese residents). The percentage of Brazilians with Japanese roots increased especially among children and adolescents. In 1991, 0.6% of Brazilians aged 0 to 14 were of Japanese ancestry; in 2000, they were 4%, as a result of the return of dekassegui (Brazilians of Japanese descent working in Japan) to Brazil.

In the 2022 Brazilian census, 850,130 people identified as "yellow," a designation by the IBGE for people of Asian descent: Japanese, Chinese, Korean. All municipalities with the highest proportions of yellow individuals were in the states of São Paulo (SP) and Paraná (PR), namely: Assaí (PR) – 11.05% of the population; Bastos (SP) – 10.3%; Uraí (PR) – 5.9%; São Sebastião da Amoreira (PR) – 4.8%; Pereira Barreto (SP) – 4.2%; Nova América da Colina (PR) – 3.8%; and Mogi das Cruzes (SP) – 3.7%. In numerical terms, the municipalities with the most yellow residents were São Paulo (238,603 people), Curitiba (23,635), Londrina (18,026), and Maringá (13,465). In 2022, Japan's Ministry of Foreign Affairs stated that there were 2 million people of Japanese origin in Brazil, but only 47,472 had Japanese nationality.

The Japanese-origin population in Brazil is extremely urban. Whereas at the beginning of immigration almost all Japanese were in rural areas, by 1958, 55.1% were already in urban centers. In 1988, 90% resided in urban areas. This early rural exodus directly influenced the occupational profile and high education level of this group. While in 1958, 56% of the Nikkei population worked in agriculture, by 1988, that number had dropped to only 12%. Meanwhile, the percentages of technical (16%) and administrative (28%) workers in the secondary and tertiary sectors increased.

== Reversal in the migration flow (Dekasegi) ==
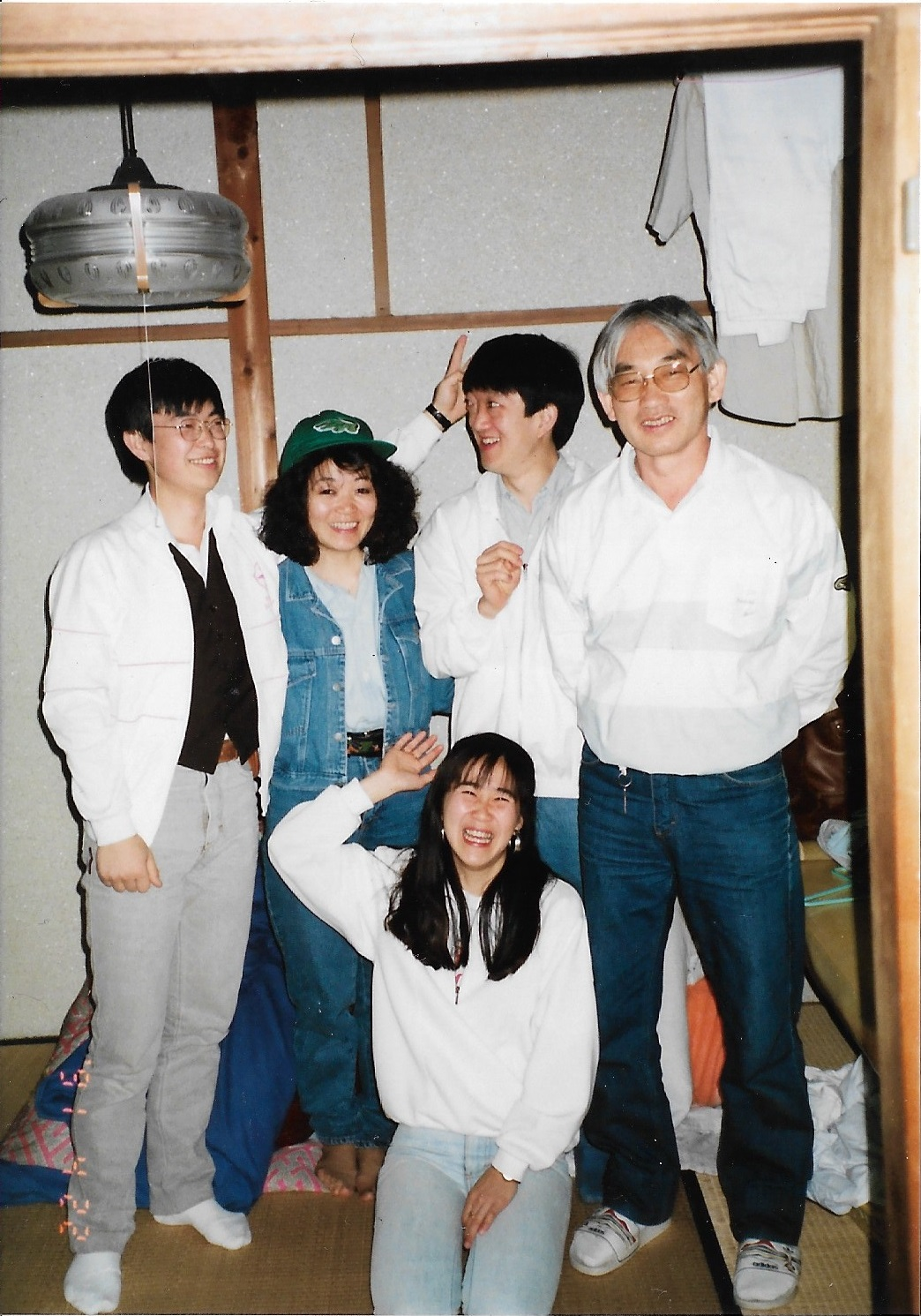
A group of Brazilians in Japan. Most Brazilian immigrants in Japan are the descendants of Japanese who immigrated to Brazil throughout the 20th century.

Starting in the late 1980s, there was a reversal in the migration flow between Brazil and Japan. Brazil entered an economic crisis, known as "Década Perdida", with inflation reaching 1,037.53% in 1988 and 1,782.85% in 1989. At the same time, Japan's economy was experiencing impressive growth, making it one of the wealthiest countries in the world. The 1980s were called "baburu keizai" (the Japanese economic bubble). The crisis in Brazil and prosperity in Japan led approximately 85,000 Japanese and their descendants living in Brazil to move to Japan between 1980 and 1990. Brazilians who went to work in Japan became known as "Dekasegis."

In the 1990s, the migration flow of Brazilians to Japan grew even more, thanks to the 1990 reform of Japan's Immigration Control Law. With this law, Japan allowed Japanese descendants born abroad, up to the third generation (children and grandchildren of Japanese), to work in Japan with long-term residence visas. This was a way for the Japanese government to address the labor shortage in Japan without disrupting the country's ethnic homogeneity, with a clear preference given to Latin Americans, mostly Brazilians, of Japanese descent. At that time, Japan was receiving a large number of illegal immigrants from Pakistan, Bangladesh, China, and Thailand. The legislation of 1990 was intended to select immigrants who entered Japan, giving a clear preference for Japanese descendants from South America, especially Brazil. Consequently, between 1990 and 2000, the number of Brazilians in Japan quintupled, reaching 250,000 people. This law also allowed Japanese descendants to bring their spouses without Japanese ancestry.

Because of their Japanese ancestry, the Japanese government presumed that Brazilians would be more easily integrated into Japanese society. In fact, this easy integration did not happen, since Japanese Brazilians and their children born in Japan are treated as foreigners by native Japanese. This apparent contradiction between being and seeming causes conflicts of adaptation for the migrants and their acceptance by the natives.

Most Brazilians who go to work in Japan are not poor, but rather middle-class individuals, who were particularly affected by Brazil's economic crises. This population, attempting to maintain or improve their standard of living, began seeking better economic conditions in Japan, the country of their ancestors. These people were lured to Japan to work in areas that the Japanese refused (the so-called "three K": Kitsui, Kitanai and Kiken – hard, dirty and dangerous). Many Brazilians go to Japan intending to work temporarily and later return with financial savings. However, these intentions are not always fulfilled, and many Brazilians opted to stay permanently in Japan.

By 2007, there were 313,770 Brazilians legally residing in Japan. Cities and prefectures with the most Brazilians in Japan were Hamamatsu, Aichi, Shizuoka, Kanagawa, Saitama, and Gunma. Brazilians in Japan are usually educated. However, they are employed in the Japanese automotive and electronics factories. Many Brazilians are subjected to hours of exhausting work, earning a small salary by Japanese standards. Nevertheless, in 2002, Brazilians living in Japan sent US$2.5 billion to Brazil.

Due to the severe financial crisis that hit Japan starting in 2008, many Brazilians returned to Brazil. By 2014, the Brazilian community in the country had decreased to 177,953 people. On the other hand, in 2023, the Brazilian community in Japan grew again, totaling 211,840 people.

In 2018, there was a new amendment to the Japanese immigration law, allowing descendants of Japanese born abroad up to the fourth generation (great-grandchildren) to work in Japan. However, for great-grandchildren, the law established stricter requirements, including an age limit and proof of Japanese language proficiency. As a result, few visas were issued: the Japanese government expected to grant 4,000 visas annually, but only 43 applications were approved in the first year of the new legislation, 17 of them to Brazilians.

In 2022, Brazilians formed the fourth-largest community of foreign workers residing in Japan, after the Chinese, Koreans and Filipinos. In 2023, the Brazilian community in Japan was the fifth-largest Brazilian community outside Brazil, surpassed only by the communities in the United States, Portugal, Paraguay, and the United Kingdom.

=== Brazilian identity in Japan ===
In Japan, many Japanese Brazilians suffer prejudice because they do not know how to speak Japanese fluently. Despite their Japanese appearance, Brazilians in Japan are culturally Brazilians, usually only speaking Portuguese, and are treated as foreigners.

The children of Dekasegi Brazilians encounter difficulties in Japanese schools. Thousands of Brazilian children are out of school in Japan.

The Brazilian influence in Japan is growing. Tokyo has the largest carnival parade outside of Brazil itself. Portuguese is the third most spoken foreign language in Japan, after Chinese and Korean, and is among the most studied languages by students in the country. In Oizumi, it is estimated that 15% of the population speak Portuguese as their native language. Japan has two newspapers in the Portuguese language, besides radio and television stations spoken in that language. Brazilian fashion and Bossa Nova music are also popular among Japanese. In 2005, there were an estimated 302,000 Brazilian nationals in Japan, of whom 25,000 also hold Japanese citizenship.

== 100th anniversary ==
In 2008, many celebrations took place in Japan and Brazil to remember the centenary of Japanese immigration. Then-Prince Naruhito of Japan arrived in Brazil on June 17 to participate in the celebrations. He visited Brasília, São Paulo, Paraná, Minas Gerais and Rio de Janeiro. Throughout his stay in Brazil, the Prince was received by a crowd of Japanese immigrants and their descendants. He broke the protocol of the Japanese Monarchy, which prohibits physical contact with people, and greeted the Brazilian people. The Prince spoke to 50,000 people during the São Paulo sambódromo and 75,000 in Paraná. He also visited the University of São Paulo, where people of Japanese descent make up 14% of the 80,000 students. Naruhito gave a speech that concluded with a thank you in Portuguese.

== Media ==
In São Paulo there are two Japanese publications, the São Paulo Shimbun and the Nikkey Shimbun. The former was established in 1946 and the latter was established in 1998. The latter has a Portuguese edition, the Jornal Nippak, and both publications have Portuguese websites. The Jornal Paulista, established in 1947, and the Diário Nippak, established in 1949, are the predecessors of the Nikkey Shimbun.

The Nambei, published in 1916, was Brazil's first Japanese newspaper. In 1933 90% of East Asian-origin Brazilians read Japanese publications, including 20 periodicals, 15 magazines, and five newspapers. The increase of the number of publications was due to Japanese immigration to Brazil. The government banned publication of Japanese newspapers during World War II.

Tatiane Matheus of Estadão stated that in the pre-World War II period the Nippak Shimbun, established in 1916; the Burajiru Jiho, established in 1917; and two newspapers established in 1932, the Nippon Shimbun and the Seishu Shino, were the most influential Japanese newspapers. All were published in São Paulo.

== Education ==
Locations of Japanese international schools, day and supplementary, in Brazil recognized by MEXT (grey dots are for closed facilities)

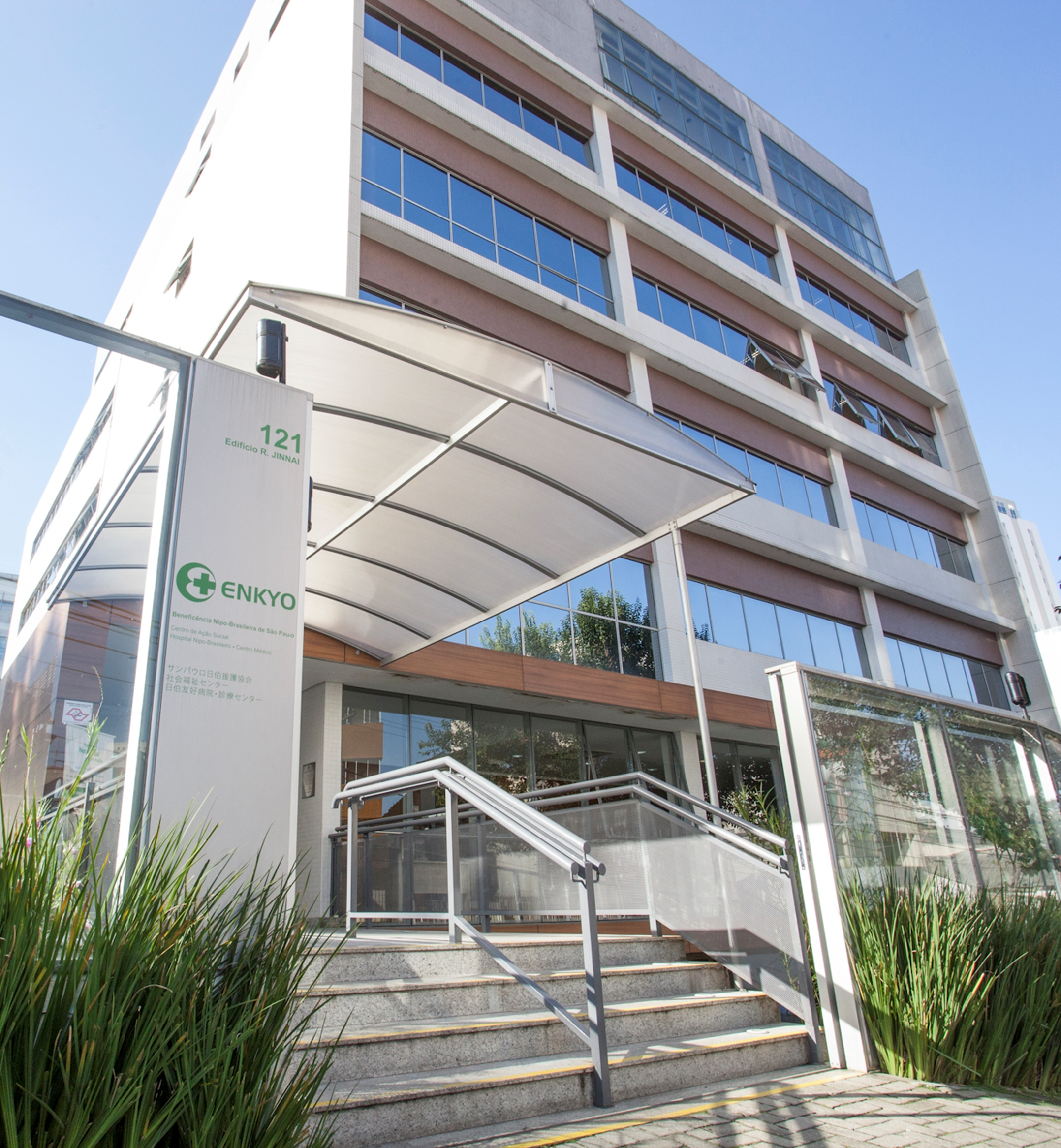
Beneficência Nipo-Brasileira de São Paulo Building. The Association owns hospitals and social institutions across Brazil.

Japanese international day schools in Brazil include the Escola Japonesa de São Paulo ("São Paulo Japanese School"), the Escola Japonesa do Rio de Janeiro in the Cosme Velho neighborhood of Rio de Janeiro, and the Escola Japonesa de Manaus. The Escola Japonesa de Belo Horizonte (ベロ・オリゾンテ日本人学校), and Japanese schools in Belém and Vitória previously existed; all three closed, and their certifications by the Japanese education ministry (MEXT) were revoked on March 29, 2002 (Heisei 14).

There are also supplementary schools teaching the Japanese language and culture. As of 2003, in southeast and south regions of the country there hundreds of Japanese supplementary schools. The Japan Foundation in São Paulo's coordinator of projects in 2003 stated that São Paulo State has about 500 supplementary schools. Around 33% of the Japanese supplementary schools in southeastern Brazil are in the city of São Paulo. As of 2003 almost all of the directors of the São Paulo schools were women.

MEXT recognizes one part-time Japanese school (hoshu jugyo ko or hoshuko), the Escola Suplementar Japonesa de Curitiba in Curitiba. MEXT-approved hoshukos in Porto Alegre and Salvador have closed.

=== History of education ===
The Taisho School, Brazil's first Japanese language school, opened in 1915 in São Paulo. In some areas full-time Japanese schools opened because no local schools existed in the vicinity of the Japanese settlements. In 1932 over 10,000 Nikkei Brazilian children attended almost 200 Japanese supplementary schools in São Paulo. By 1938 Brazil had a total of 600 Japanese schools.

In 1970, 22,000 students, taught by 400 teachers, attended 350 supplementary Japanese schools. In 1992 there were 319 supplementary Japanese language schools in Brazil with a total of 18,782 students, 10,050 of them being female and 8,732 of them being male. Of the schools, 111 were in São Paulo State and 54 were in Paraná State. At the time, the São Paulo Metropolitan Area had 95 Japanese schools, and the schools in the city limits of São Paulo had 6,916 students.

In the 1980s, São Paulo Japanese supplementary schools were larger than those in other communities. In general, during that decade a Brazilian supplementary Japanese school had one or two teachers responsible for around 60 students.

Hiromi Shibata, a PhD student at the University of São Paulo, wrote the dissertation As escolas japonesas paulistas (1915–1945), published in 1997. Jeff Lesser, author of Negotiating National Identity: Immigrants, Minorities, and the Struggle for Ethnicity in Brazil, wrote that the author "suggests" that the Japanese schools in São Paulo "were as much an affirmation of Nipo-Brazilian identity as they were of Japanese nationalism."

== See also ==
- South America Hongwanji Mission
- List of Japanese Brazilians
- Asian Latin Americans
- Brazilians in Japan
- Brazil–Japan relations
- Japanese Peruvians
- Japanese Argentines
- Shindo Renmei
- Japanese immigration in Brazil
