= Assaí =

Coordinates: 23.3728°S 50.8408°W

Assaí, Paraná, Brazil
- Municipality
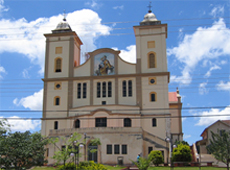

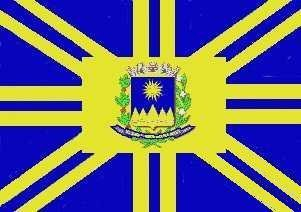
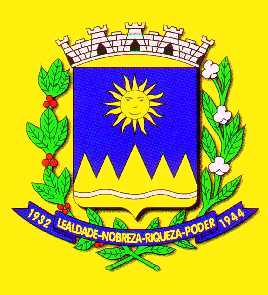
- Flag Coat of arms
- Interactive map of Assaí, Paraná, Brazil
- Country: Brazil
- Region: South
- State: Paraná
- Mesoregion: Norte Pioneiro Paranaense

Government
  - Mayor: Michel Angelo Bomtempo (PSD)

Population (2020)
  - Total: 14,954
- Time zone: UTC−3 (BRT)

Assaí is a municipality in the state of Paraná in the South Region of Brazil. Founded by Japanese immigrants in 1932, the city is noted for having the highest percentage of Asian Brazilians in the country.

== History ==
Assaí was founded in 1932 by Japanese immigrants, becoming a municipality on January 28, 1944. Assaí is among a number of small cities in Brazil founded by Japanese immigrants, including Bastos and Pereira Barreto in São Paulo.

The city was initially named Assailand, before ultimately being renamed in 1944.

=== Asian heritage ===
The city has the highest reported percentage of Asian Brazilians in the country, comprising 11.5% of the population. In 2018, the city inaugurated a Japanese-style castle in a ceremony attended by around 4,000 spectators. The castle was modeled by Himeji Castle in Japan's Hyōgo Prefecture, which itself is a "sister province" of the state of Paraná.

== Politics and government ==
In the second round of the 2022 Brazilian general election, Assaí voted for Jair Bolsonaro with 70.43% of the vote, with Luiz Inácio Lula da Silva taking 29.57% of the vote.

The city's current mayor is Michel Angelo Bomtempo, a member of the Social Democratic Party (PSD).

== See also ==
- List of municipalities in Paraná
- Asian Brazilians
- Japanese Brazilians
