= List of Japanese Brazilians =

This is a list of Japanese Brazilians, that is, notable people of Japanese ancestry born or raised in Brazil. Japanese immigration to Brazil started in 1908 with the arrival of the Kasato Maru.

Image	Name	Lifespan	Occupation(s)
	Luiz Gushiken	5 August 1950 — 13 September 2013 (aged 63)	Politician
	Hugo Hoyama	born 9 May 1969 (age 56)	Table tennis player
	Augusto Akio	born 12 December 2000 (age 24)	Skateboarder
	Kim Kataguiri	born 28 January 1996 (age 30)	Political activist, politician
	Lovefoxxx	born 25 February 1984 (age 41)	Singer
	Mitsuyo Maeda	18 November 1878 — 28 November 1941 (aged 63)	Judoka
	Paulo Nagamura	born 2 March 1983 (age 42)	Footballer
	Tomie Ohtake	21 November 1913 — 12 February 2015 (aged 101)	Visual artist
	Lisa Ono	born 29 July 1962 (age 63)	Musician
	Juniti Saito	born 12 April 1942 (age 83)	Brazilian Air Force commander
	Sabrina Sato	born 4 February 1981 (age 44)	TV presenter, comedian, actress
	Daniele Suzuki	born 21 September 1977 (age 48)	TV presenter, actress
	Fernanda Takai	born 25 August 1971 (age 54)	Singer
	Carlos Toshiki	born 7 April 1964 (age 61)	Singer

== See also ==
- Foreign-born Japanese
- List of Japanese people
- List of Brazilians
