= Ryo Mizuno (pioneer) =

Japanese entrepreneur, politician and pioneer (1859–1951)

- 水野 龍
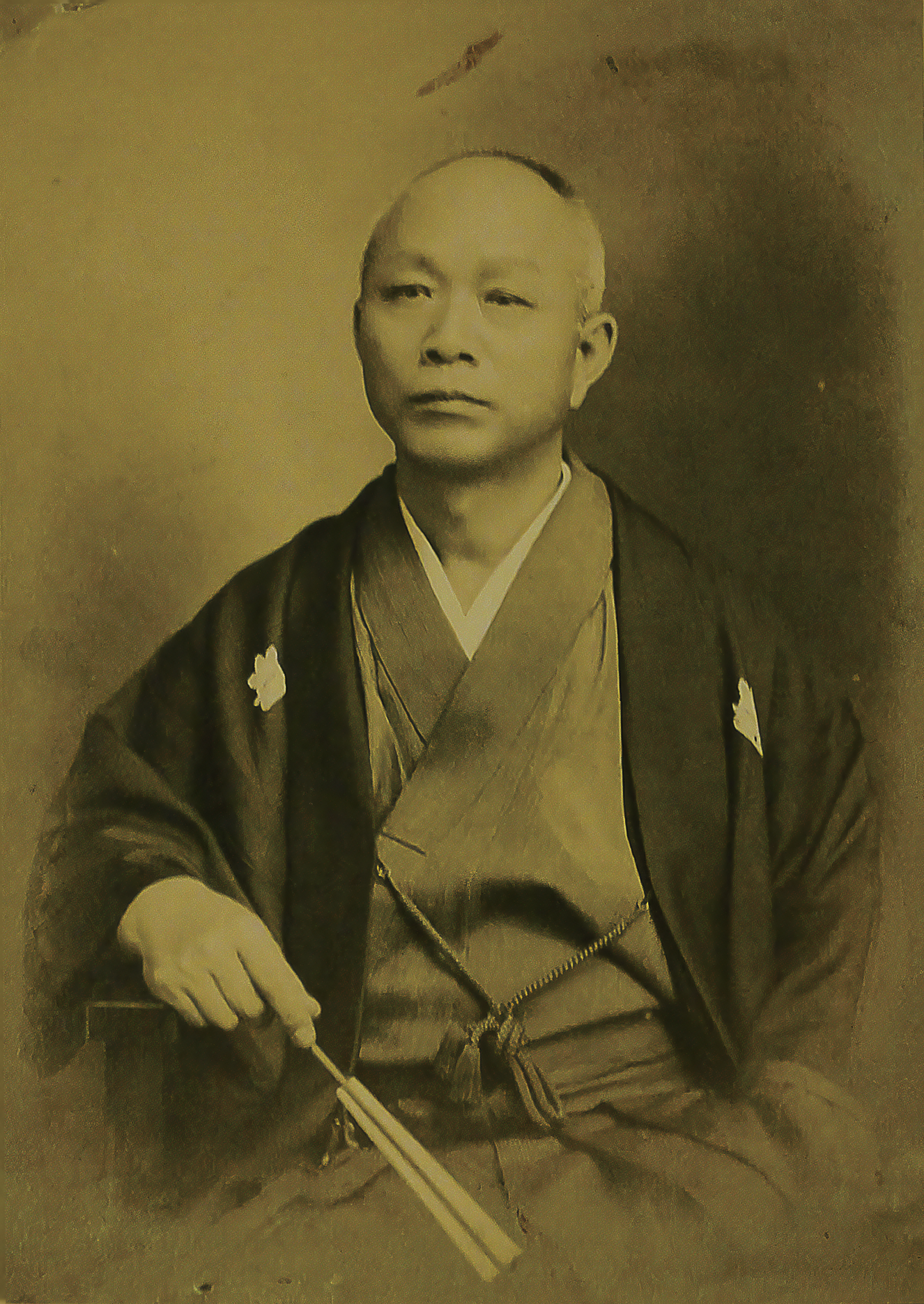
- Ryo Mizuno portrait
- Born: 4 December 1859; Tosa Province, Japan
- Died: 20 August 1951 (aged 91)
- Occupations: entrepreneur; politician; company president
- Title: President of Koukoku Shokumin Gaisha

Ryo Mizuno (水野 龍, Mizuno Ryo; December 4, 1859 – August 20, 1951), was a Japanese entrepreneur, politician and pioneer. He was president of Koukoku Shokumin Gaisha ("Imperial Emigration Company"), which transported the first Japanese immigrants to Brazil in 1908, aboard the Kasato Maru.

== Biography ==
=== Early life ===
Ryo Mizuno was born in Tosa Province (present Kōchi Prefecture) on December 4, 1859.

=== Crossing the Andes ===
Mizuno decided to go to Brazil in 1906, after reading a report on the situation of coffea growing in the country. On the ship Green Farg, on which he made that first trip, he met Teijiro Suzuki, who was heading to Chile. Mizuno decided to change his itinerary, and after reaching their destination, he convinced Suzuki to accompany him to Argentina, crossing the Andes mountain range from Valparaíso on foot. This risky crossing would have been the answer given to the challenge made by a Chilean.

After numerous mishaps, the duo arrived in Mendoza where they had a triumphant reception, and went by train to Buenos Aires, where they boarded a ship to Rio de Janeiro.

=== In Brazil ===
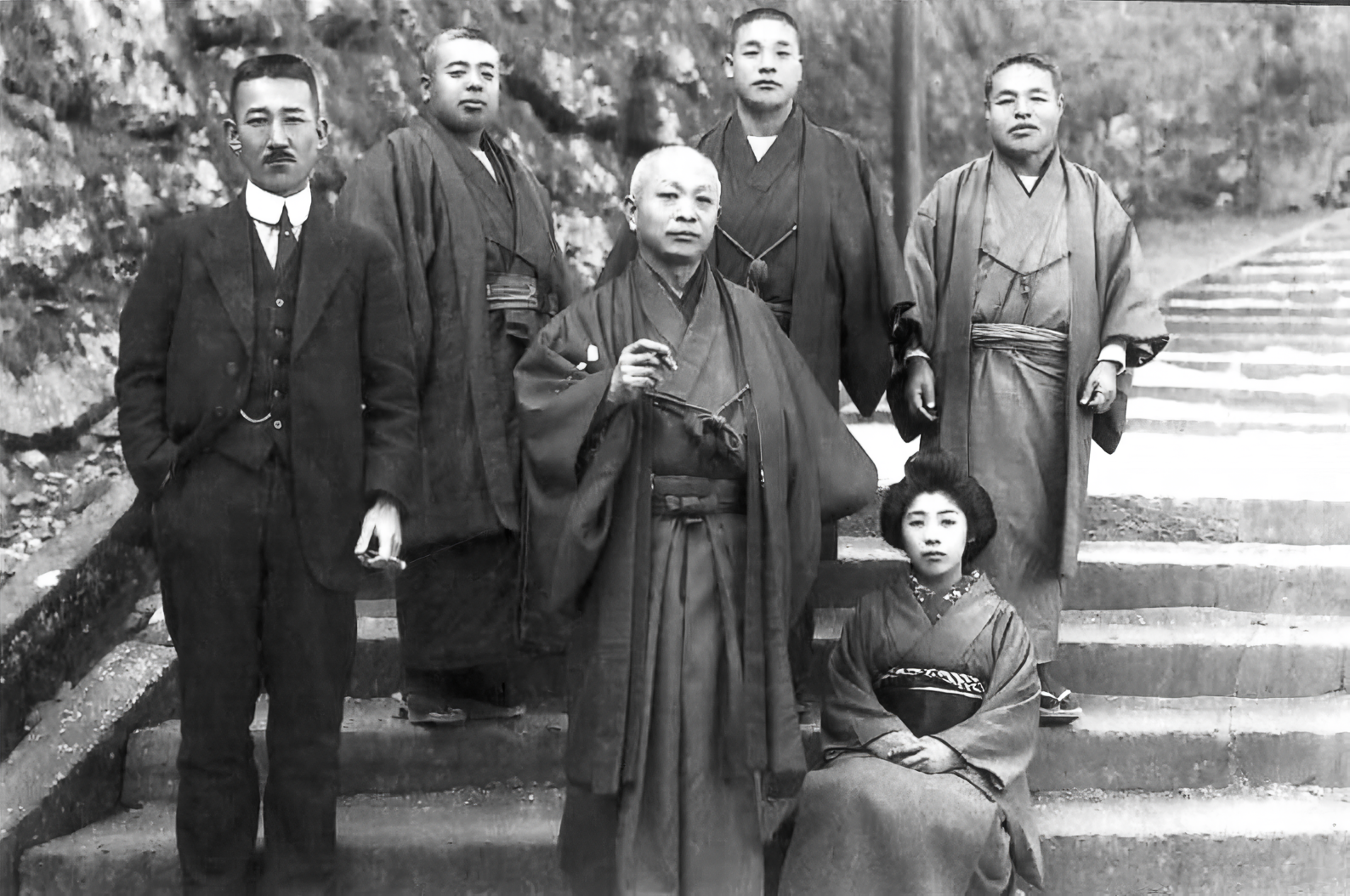
Mizuno (center) and family in c1906

Upon their arrival in Rio in March 1906, Mizuno and Suzuki sought out the Japanese minister Suguimura, who was in Petrópolis, and reported his project to bring immigrants to Brazil. The minister decided to support them and put his interpreter, Miura, at their disposal.

The trio then left for São Paulo, where they got in touch with local authorities, including Governor Jorge Tibiriçá, to propose the project. It then became clear that the Japanese could not come if there was no change in the immigration law.

Mizuno then returned to Rio and embarked for Japan, where he worked to change the laws that prevented Japanese emigration.

=== The return ===
In 1907, after overcoming the bureaucratic obstacles to Japanese emigration, the Imperial Company of Emigration and the Secretary of Agriculture of São Paulo signed a contract which provided for the sending of 3,000 immigrants over three years. The first group, made up of 781 people (158 families), left Kobe on April 28, 1908, arriving at the Port of Santos on June 18 the same year.

The harsh conditions of life and work prevailing in the farming at the time caused dissatisfaction and numerous breaches of contract among the Japanese, with several families returning to the Hospedaria dos Imigrantes, from where they were forwarded to new jobs. Mizuno managed to work around most of these problems and prevented the 1907 contract from being cancelled.

In 1915 he became president of Koukoku Shokumin Gaisha (Imperial Emigration Company).

In 1926, he received a donation from the government of Paraná, 2,767 hectares of land, where he implemented an agricultural colony, Alvorada, in socialist molds.

On one of his trips to Japan, in search of new immigrants, Mizuno left his family in São Paulo and was surprised by the outbreak of World War II. During the conflict, Mizuno lost practically all of his assets, only to find his family again in 1950.

Ryo Mizuno died at the age of 91 in São Paulo on August 20, 1951.

== See also ==
- Japanese immigration in Brazil
- Japanese Brazilians
