= Assai =

Assai may mean:

- Assai in musical terminology, meaning "very"
- Euterpe, a genus of palms commonly called Açaí or Assai Palm
- Assaí, a municipality located in Paraná state, Brazil
- Assai (company), a Dutch multinational software company based in Culemborg, The Netherlands
