= Ryo Mizuno (disambiguation) =

Ryo Mizuno (水野 良, 1963) is a Japanese author and game designer.

Ryo Mizuno may also refer to:

- Ryo Mizuno (motorcyclist) (水野 涼, 1998), Japanese motorcycle racer
- Ryo Mizuno (pioneer) (水野 龍, 1859-1951), Japanese entrepreneur, politician and pioneer
