= Nova América da Colina =

Coordinates: 23°20′S 50°42′W

- Municipality
- Country: Brazil
- Region: Southern
- State: Paraná
- Mesoregion: Norte Pioneiro Paranaense

Population (2020)
  - Total: 3,434
- Time zone: UTC−3 (BRT)

Nova América da Colina is a municipality in the state of Paraná in the Southern Region of Brazil.

== See also ==
- List of municipalities in Paraná
