= São Sebastião da Amoreira =

Coordinates: 23°28′S 50°45′W

- Municipality
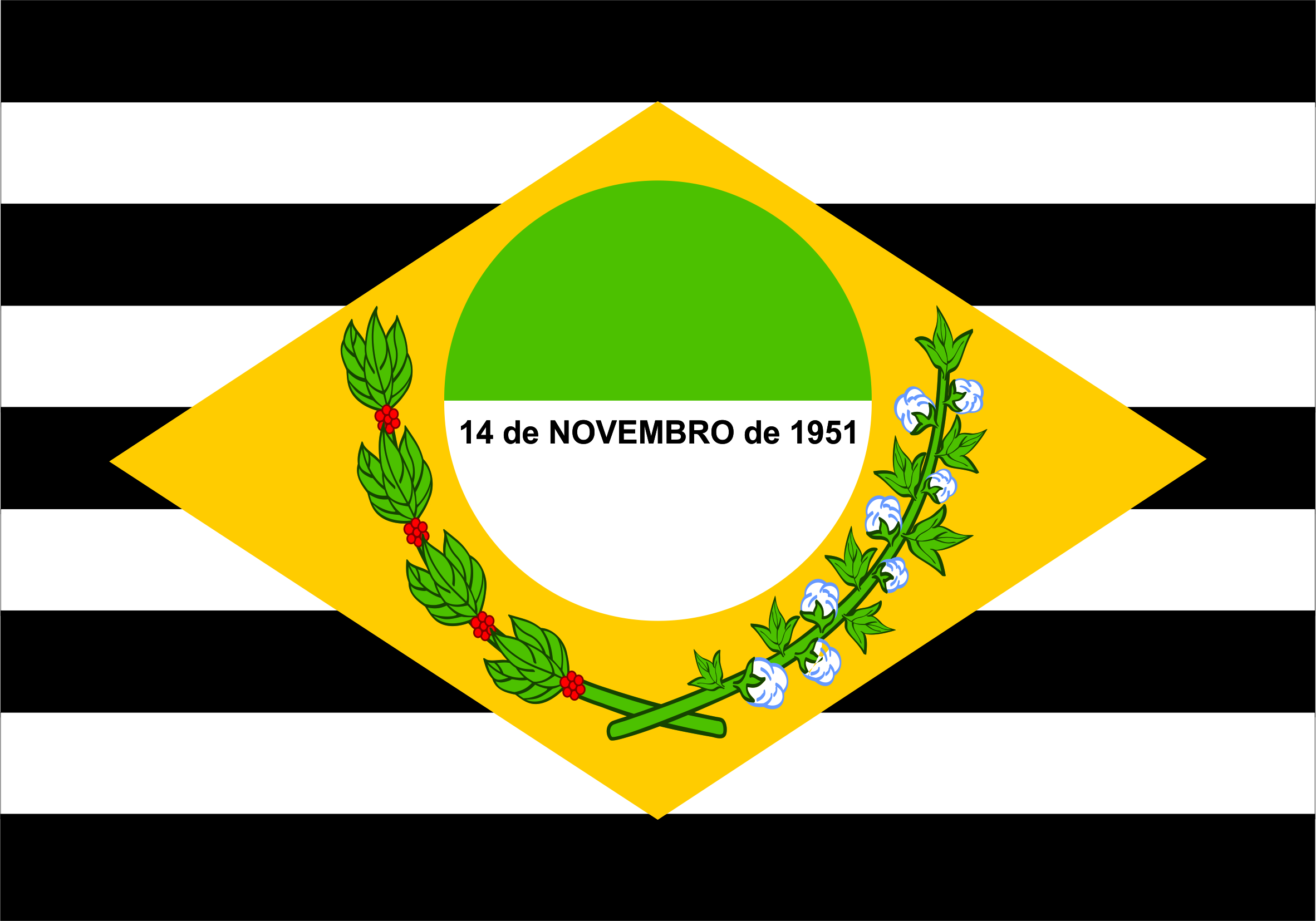
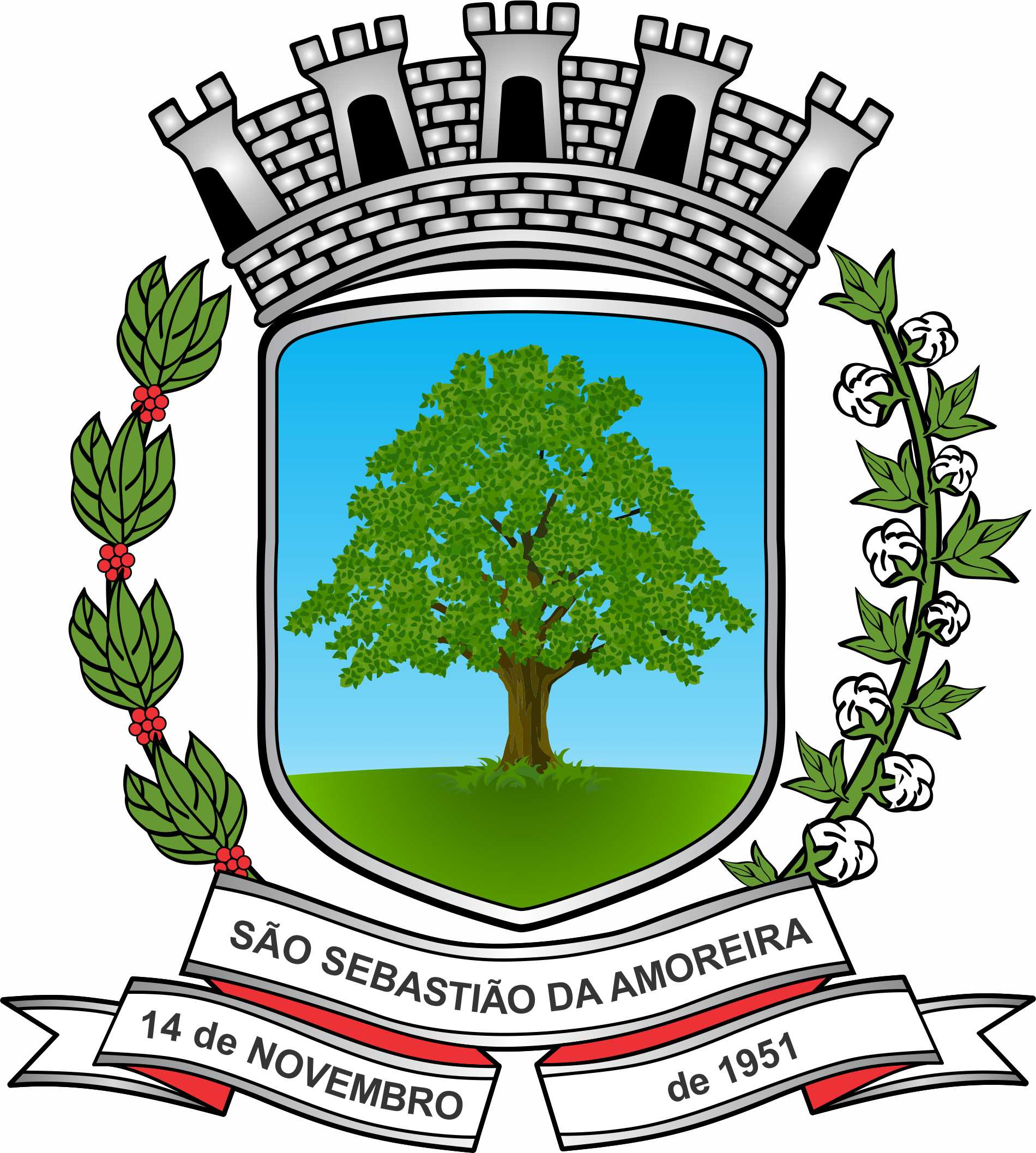
- Flag Coat of arms
- Interactive map of São Sebastião da Amoreira
- Country: Brazil
- Region: Southern
- State: Paraná
- Mesoregion: Norte Pioneiro Paranaense

Population (2020)
  - Total: 8,859
- Time zone: UTC−3 (BRT)

São Sebastião da Amoreira is a municipality in the state of Paraná in the Southern Region of Brazil.

== See also ==
- List of municipalities in Paraná
