= Pereira Barreto =

Municipality in Brazil

- Municipality
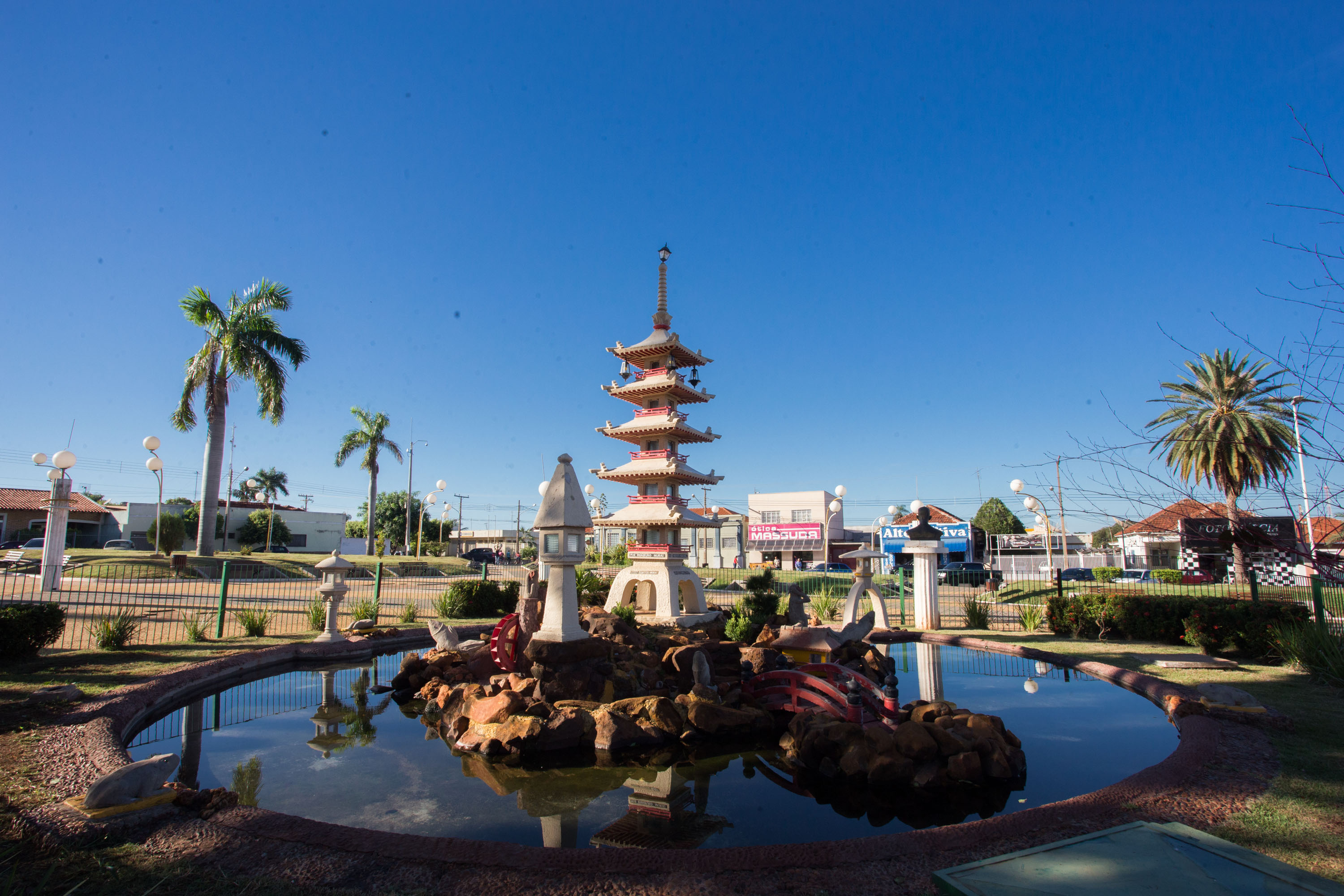

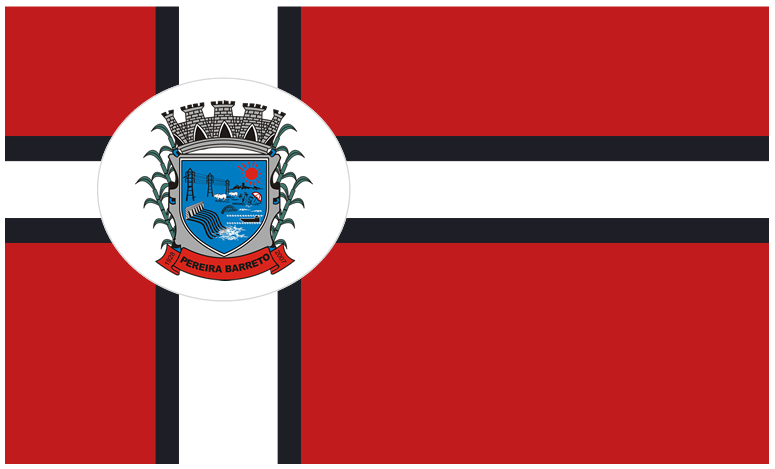
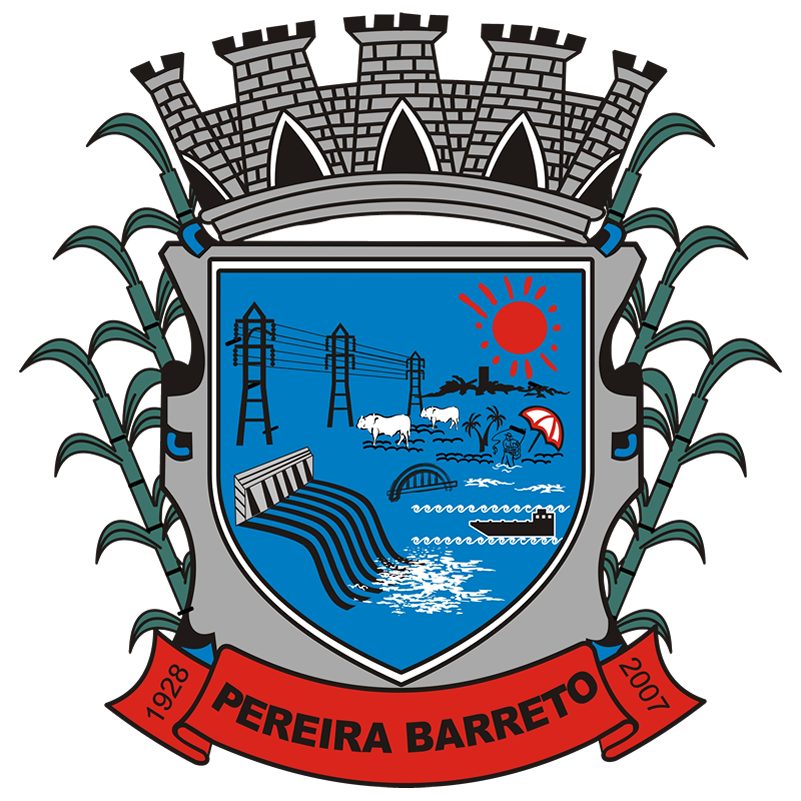
- Flag Coat of arms

- Location in São Paulo state

- Location in Brazil
- Coordinates: 20°38′18″S 51°6′33″W
- Country: Brazil
- Region: Southeast
- State: São Paulo

Area
  - Total: 974 km^{2} (376 sq mi)

Population (2020)
  - Total: 25,677
  - Density: 26.4/km^{2} (68.3/sq mi)
- Time zone: UTC−3 (BRT)

Pereira Barreto is a municipality in the state of São Paulo in Brazil. The population is 25,677 (2020 est.) in an area of 974 km^{2} (376 sq mi). The elevation is 347 meters.

== History ==
The municipality was created by state law in 1938.

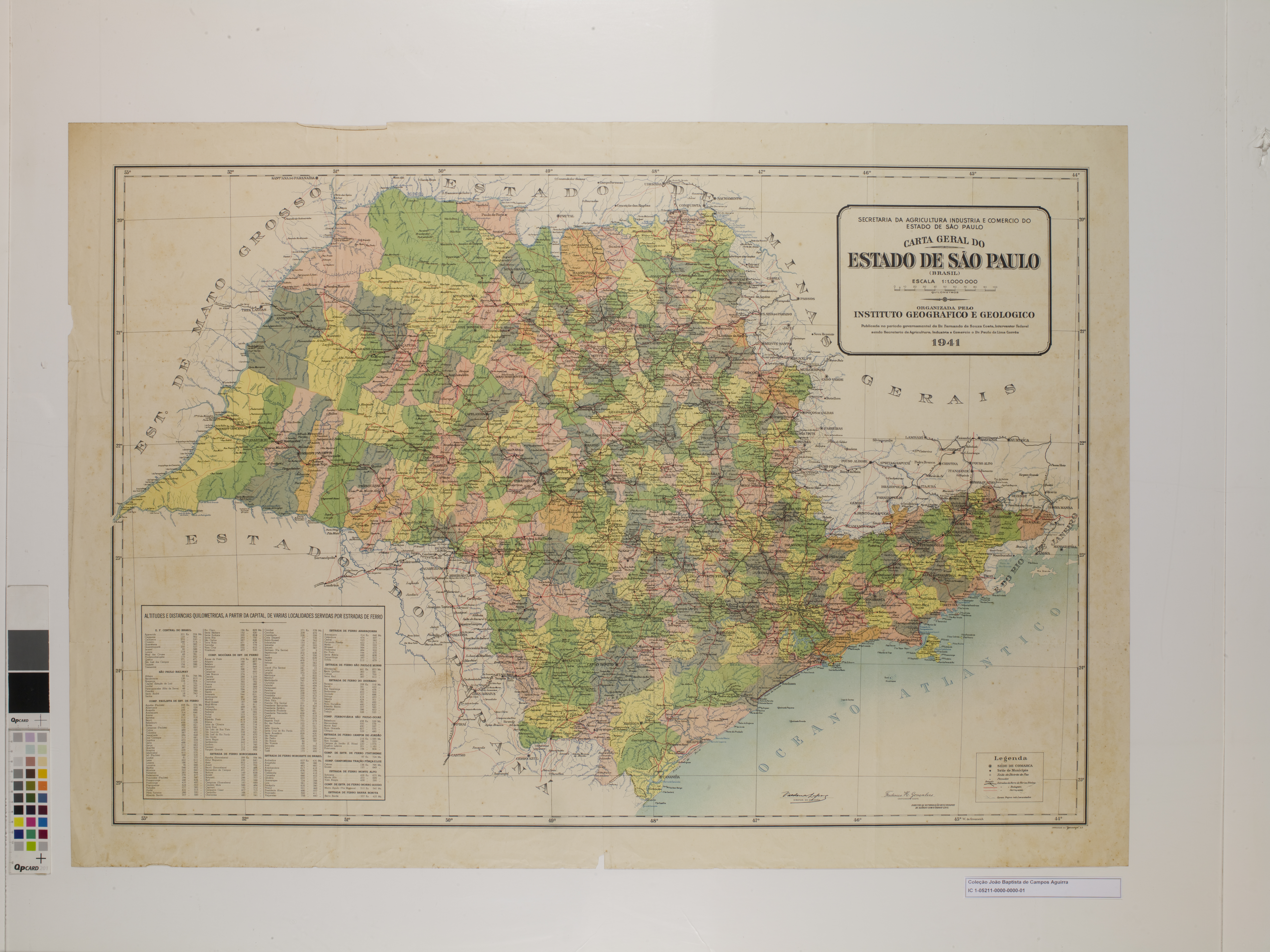
Map of the state of São Paulo (1938).

== Demographics ==
Historical population (municipality)
Year	Population	%±
1940	10,753	—
1950	27,749	158.1%
1960	33,543	20.9%
1970	52,413	56.3%
1980	46,366	−11.5%
1991	49,932	7.7%
2000	25,028	−49.9%
2010	24,962	−0.3%
2022	24,095	−3.5%

== Media ==
In telecommunications, the city was served by Companhia de Telecomunicações do Estado de São Paulo until 1975, when it began to be served by Telecomunicações de São Paulo. In July 1998, this company was acquired by Telefónica, which adopted the Vivo brand in 2012.

The company is currently an operator of cell phones, fixed lines, internet (fiber optics/4G) and television (satellite and cable).

== See also ==
- List of municipalities in São Paulo
- Interior of São Paulo
