= Bastos, Brazil =

Municipality in the state of São Paulo in Brazil

Bastos
- Municipality
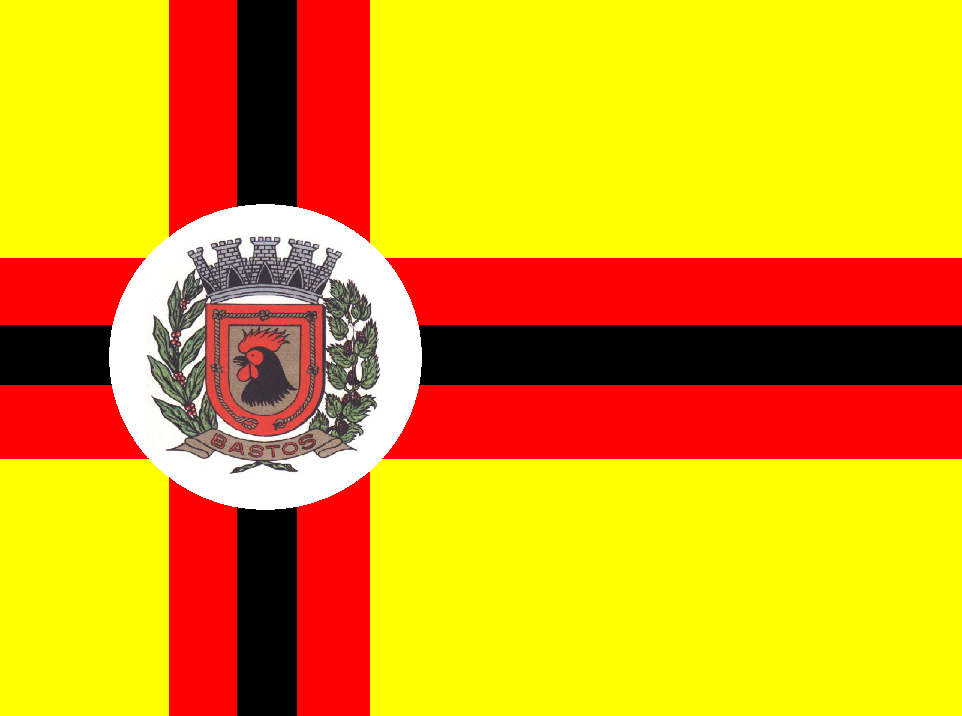
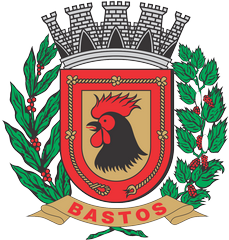
- Flag Coat of arms

- Location in São Paulo state

- Location in Brazil
- Coordinates: 21°55′19″S 50°43′55″W
- Country: Brazil
- Region: Southeast
- State: São Paulo

Area
  - Total: 172 km^{2} (66 sq mi)
- Highest elevation: 445 m (1,460 ft)

Population (2020)
  - Total: 20,953
  - Density: 122/km^{2} (316/sq mi)
- Time zone: UTC−3 (BRT)

Bastos is a municipality in the state of São Paulo in Brazil. The population is 20,953 (2020 est.) in an area of 172 km^{2}.

== History ==
The name originated from Henrique Bastos, who owned a farm in the area. And it was these same lands that the foundation of the city occurred on June 18, 1928, by Senjiro Hatanaka, sent by the Japanese government to look for land to receive the waves of Japanese immigrants.

The municipality was created by state law in 1944.

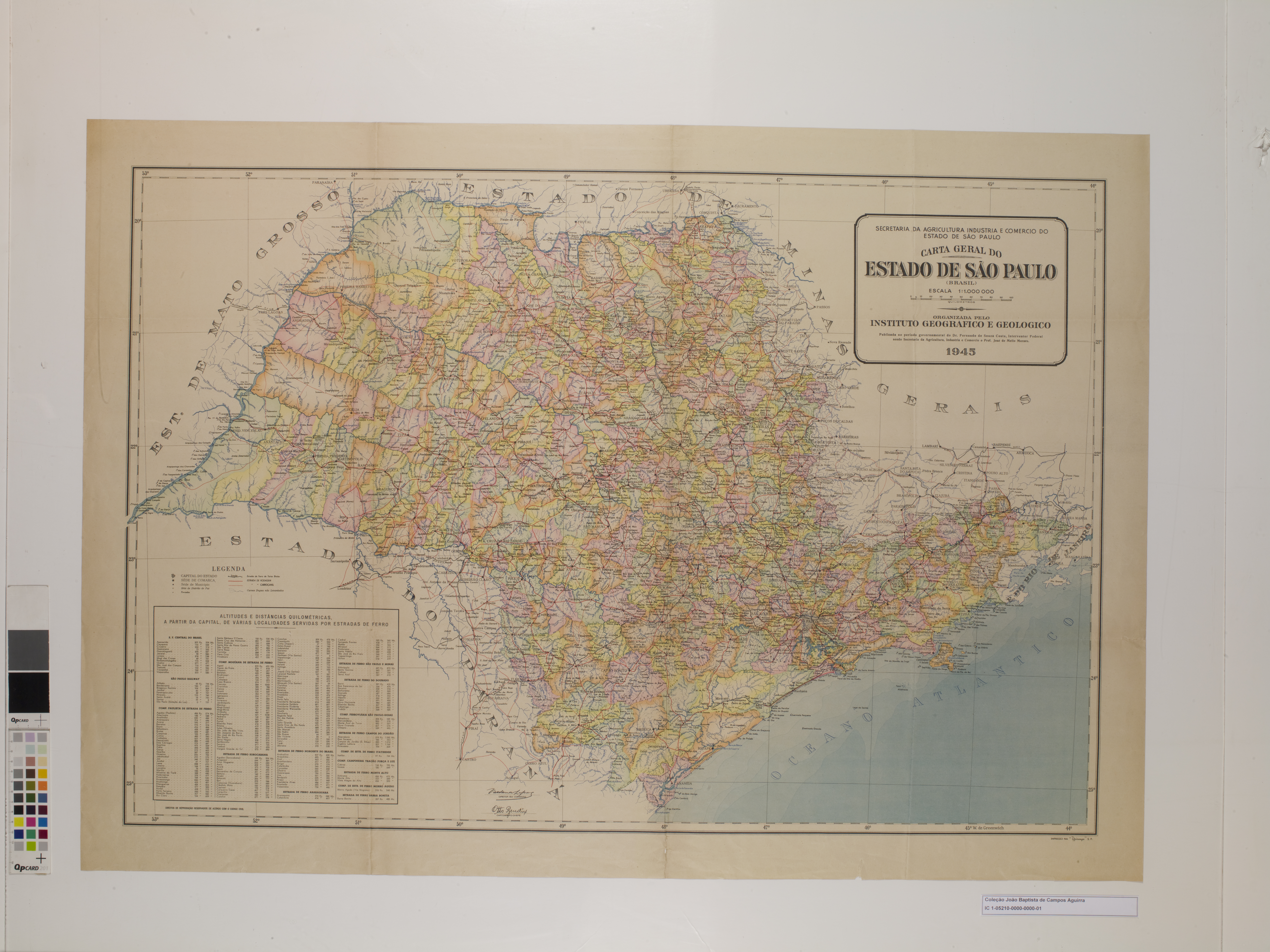
Map of the state of São Paulo (1944).

== Demographics ==
Historical population (municipality)
| Year | Population | %± |
|---|---|---|
| 1950 | 6,150 | — |
| 1960 | 6,291 | 2.3% |
| 1970 | 9,657 | 53.5% |
| 1980 | 15,343 | 58.9% |
| 1991 | 19,116 | 24.6% |
| 2000 | 20,588 | 7.7% |
| 2010 | 20,445 | −0.7% |
| 2022 | 21,503 | 5.2% |

=== Census 2000 ===
Total Population : 20,588

- Urban: 17,040
- Rural: 3548
- Male: 10,247
- Female: 10,341

Population density (inhabitants / km ²): 120.82

Infant mortality by 1 year (per thousand): 8.78

Life expectancy (years): 75.55

Fertility rate (children per woman): 2.06

Literacy Rate : 90.20%

Human Development Index (HDI): 0.798

- HDI-M Income: 0.693
- HDI-M Longevity: 0.843
- HDI-M Education: 0.859

(Source: IPEA DATA)

=== Ethnic groups ===
Source: 2000 census:

| Color / Race | % |
|---|---|
| White | 57.4% |
| Black | 2.0% |
| Pardo | 28.6% |
| Asian | 11.4% |
| Indigenous | 0.1% |

== Economy ==
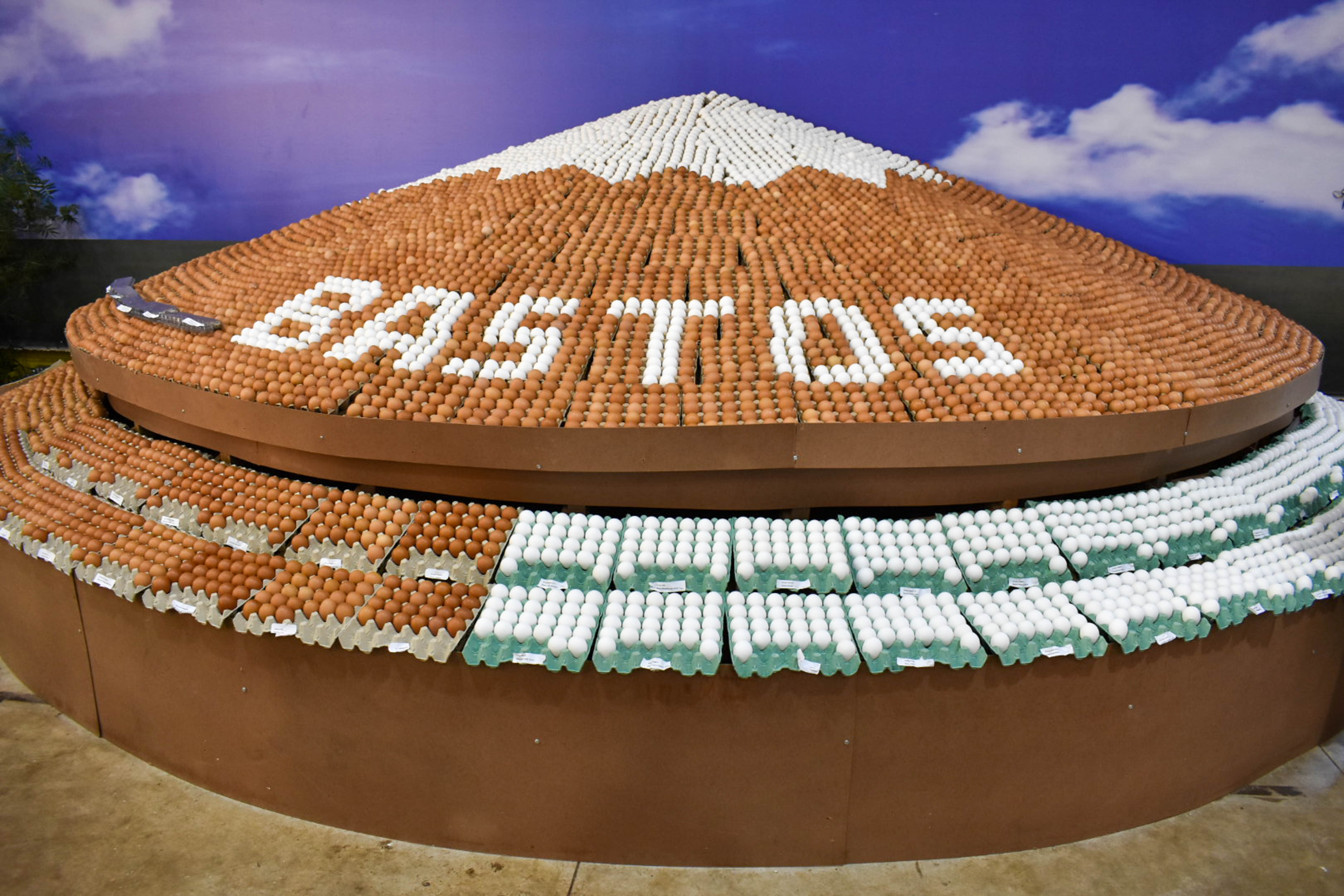
Egg Festival.

After cycles of crops such as coffee, cotton, sericulture, from 1957, the council found its economic vocation: the laying poultry.

The city has the largest flock of laying hens in the country and thus is the municipality with the highest production of eggs from Brazil, so the self-titling of "capital of the egg."

Bastos is also the headquarters of the Brazilian city of the Egg Festival. This festival brings together not only an exhibition of innovations and products used in the poultry industry, as well as concerts and entertainment for the general population and the region of Bastos.

== Media ==
In telecommunications, the city was served by Telecomunicações de São Paulo. In July 1998, this company was acquired by Telefónica, which adopted the Vivo brand in 2012. The company is currently an operator of cell phones, fixed lines, internet (fiber optics/4G) and television (satellite and cable).

== Religion ==
Christianity is present in the city as follows:

=== Catholic Church ===
The Catholic church in the municipality is part of the Roman Catholic Diocese of Marília.

=== Protestant Church ===
The most diverse evangelical beliefs are present in the city, mainly Pentecostal, including the Assemblies of God in Brazil (the largest evangelical church in the country), Christian Congregation in Brazil, among others. These denominations are growing more and more throughout Brazil.

== See also ==
- List of municipalities in São Paulo
