= Kasato Maru =

Japanese cargo/passenger ship

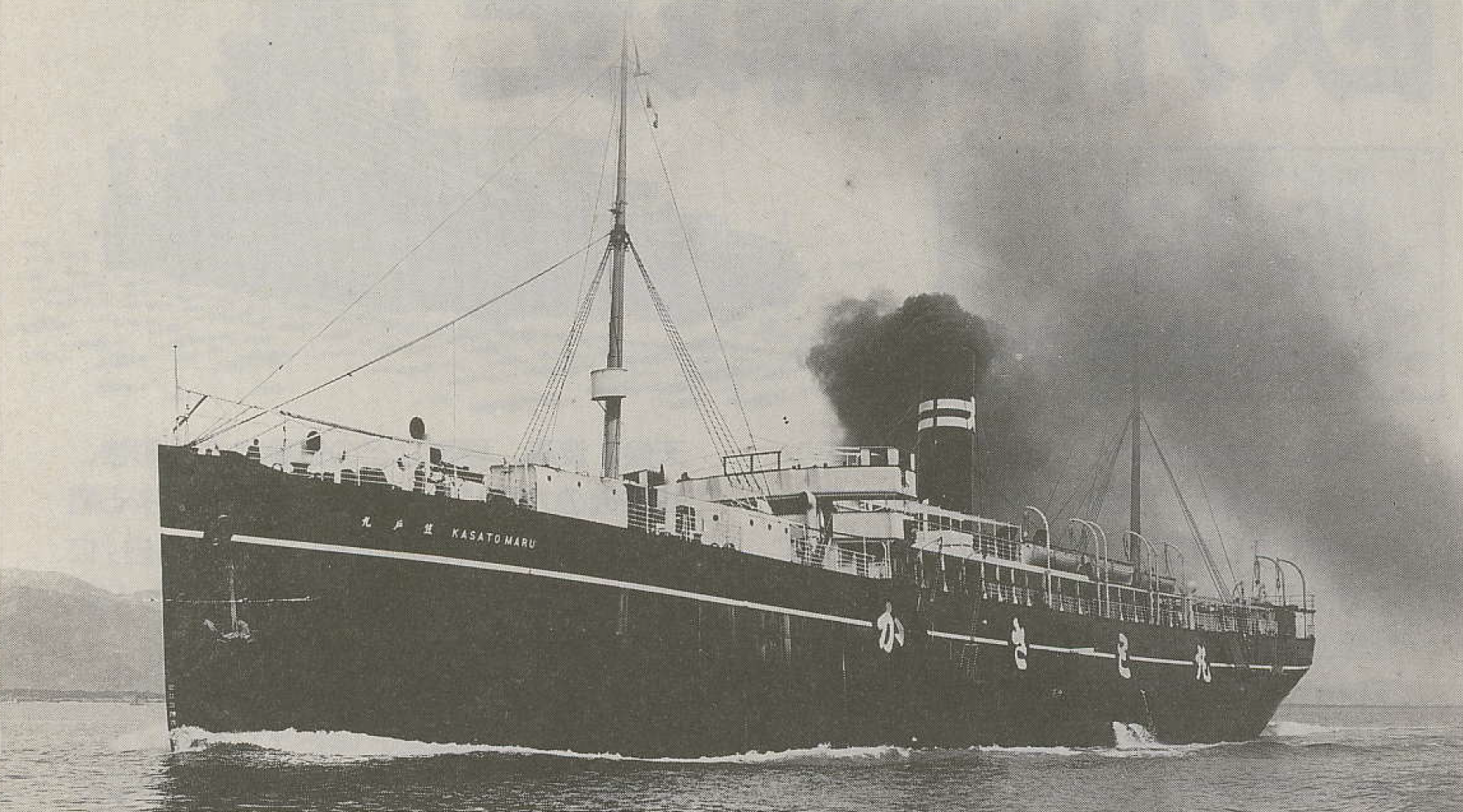

History
- Name: Kasato Maru
- Owner: Pacific Steam Navigation Company (1900); Dobroflot (1900-1905); Imperial Japanese Navy (1906-1912); OSK Line (1912-1933); Shinko Suisan Kaisha (1934-1939); Nippon Suisan Kaisha (1939-1945)
- Builder: Wigham Richardson & Sons Ltd., Newcastle-Upon-Tyne
- Cost: £97026
- Yard number: 362
- Launched: 13 June 1900 (as SS Potosí)
- Completed: 25 August 1900
- Fate: Wrecked by air raid off the coast of Kamchatka

General characteristics
- Tonnage: 6003 grt
- Length: 123.4 metres (405 ft)
- Beam: 15.4 metres (51 ft)
- Height: 5.8 metres (19 ft)
- Installed power: 600 n.h.p.
- Propulsion: 2 x 3 cyl. triple expansion engines, dual shaft, 2 screws
- Speed: 14.5 knots

Kasato Maru or Kasado Maru (Japanese: 笠戸丸) was a Japanese cargo/passenger ship built by the British shipyard Wigham Richardson in 1900. Originally christened as SS Potosí, the ship was bought by the Russian Dobroflot, and renamed Kazan, being used as a hospital ship. She was sunk by the Japanese Navy during the Russo-Japanese War, salvaged and passed to the Japanese control as compensation for war.

She was adapted to be a passenger ship and renamed as Kasato Maru and transported the soldiers who had fought in Manchuria back to Japan.

She was then used to transport Japanese immigrants to Hawaii in 1906 and to Peru and Mexico in 1907. In 1908, she brought the first official group of Japanese immigrants to Brazil. The trip began at the port of Kobe and ended, 52 days later, at the Port of Santos on June 18, 1908. There came 165 families (781 people) who went to work in the coffee plantations of the west of São Paulo.

Some Japanese immigrants arrived at Brazil before Kasato Maru, founding an agricultural colony in the current municipality of Conceição de Macabu (then district of Macaé), in the state of Rio de Janeiro. However, it was the arrival of this first group brought by Kasato Maru that initiated a continuous flow of immigration from Japan to Brazil. Some of the Kasato Maru's passengers continued to Argentina (see es:Café El Japonés).

After some time, Kasato Maru was transformed into a freighter ship and still returned to Brazil a second and last time, in 1917, transporting loads in the service of Osaka Sosen Kaisha (OSK) Line.

In 1942 she was requisitioned by the Imperial Japanese Navy and became part of the Japanese fleet in World War II as a support ship.

On 9 August 1945, Kasato Maru was bombed by three Soviet aircraft from 11:15. to 14:30. Kasato Maru then sank into the Bering Sea in the Soviet waters near the Kamchatka Peninsula. It is currently submerged to a depth of 18 meters and in good state of conservation.

== Gallery ==
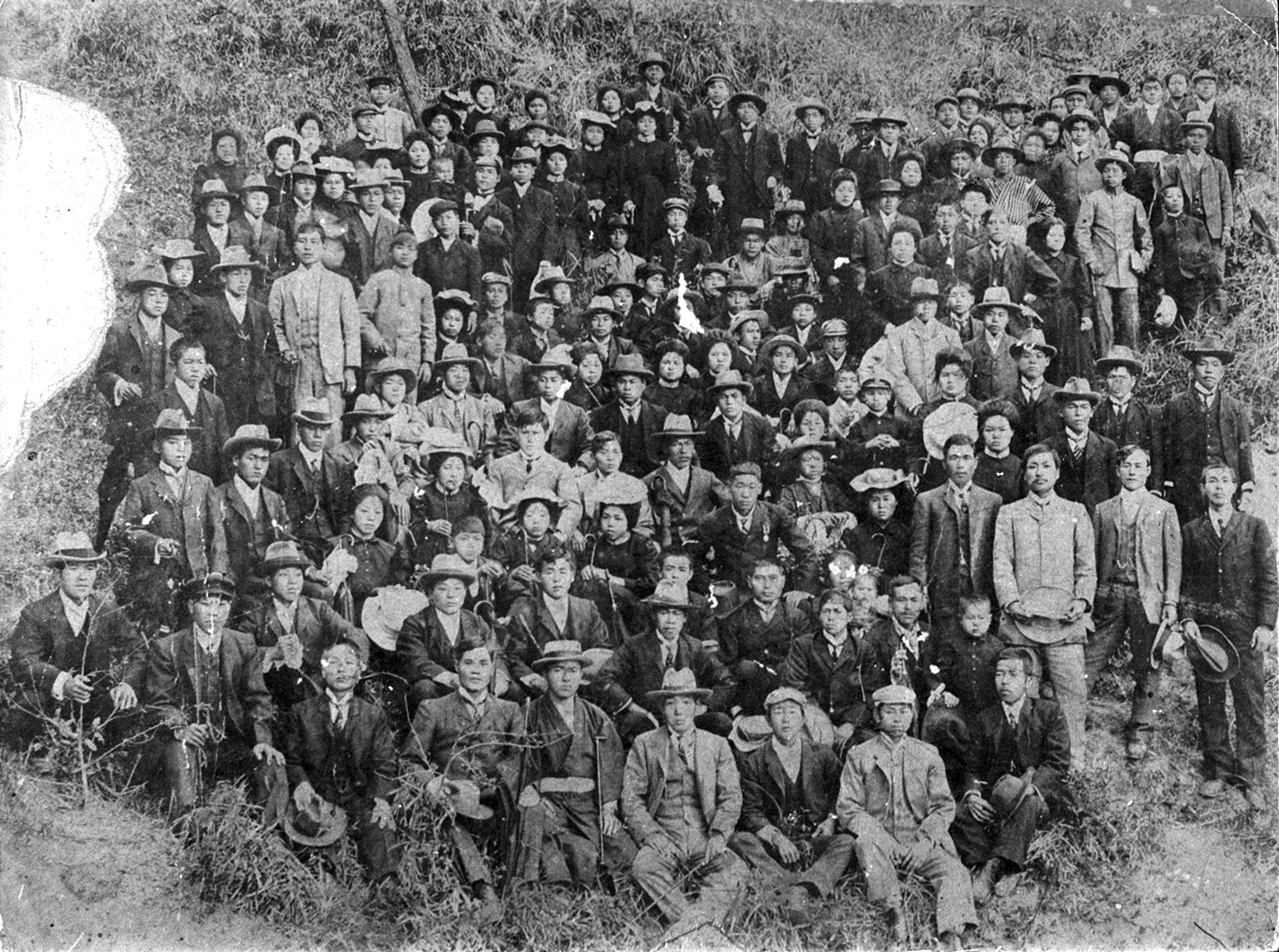
Passengers of the Kasato Maru in Japan a few days before travelling to Brazil, next to a temple where they prayed for a safe trip (1908)

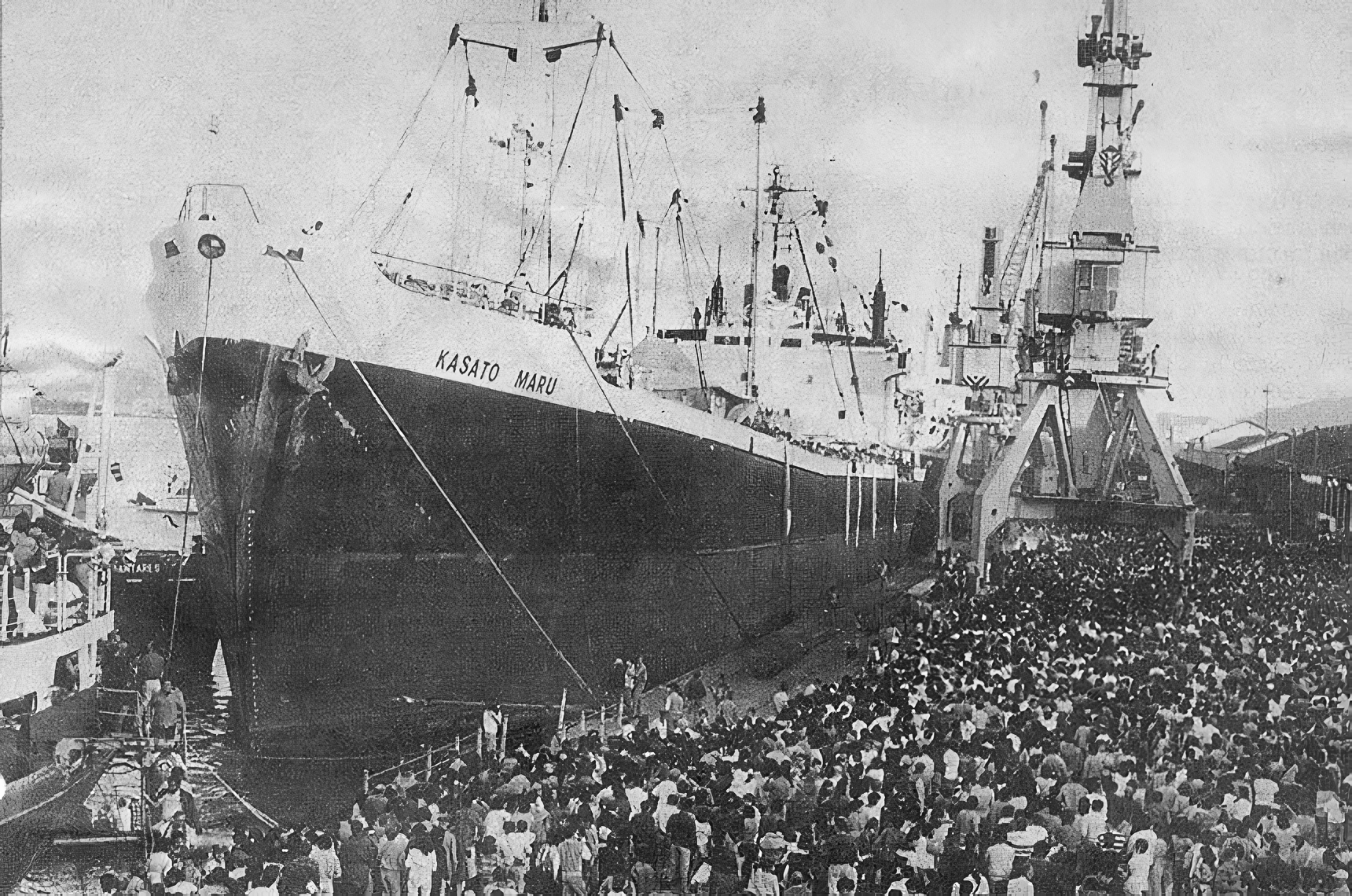
Kasato Maru with Japanese migrants after arriving in Port of Santos (1908)

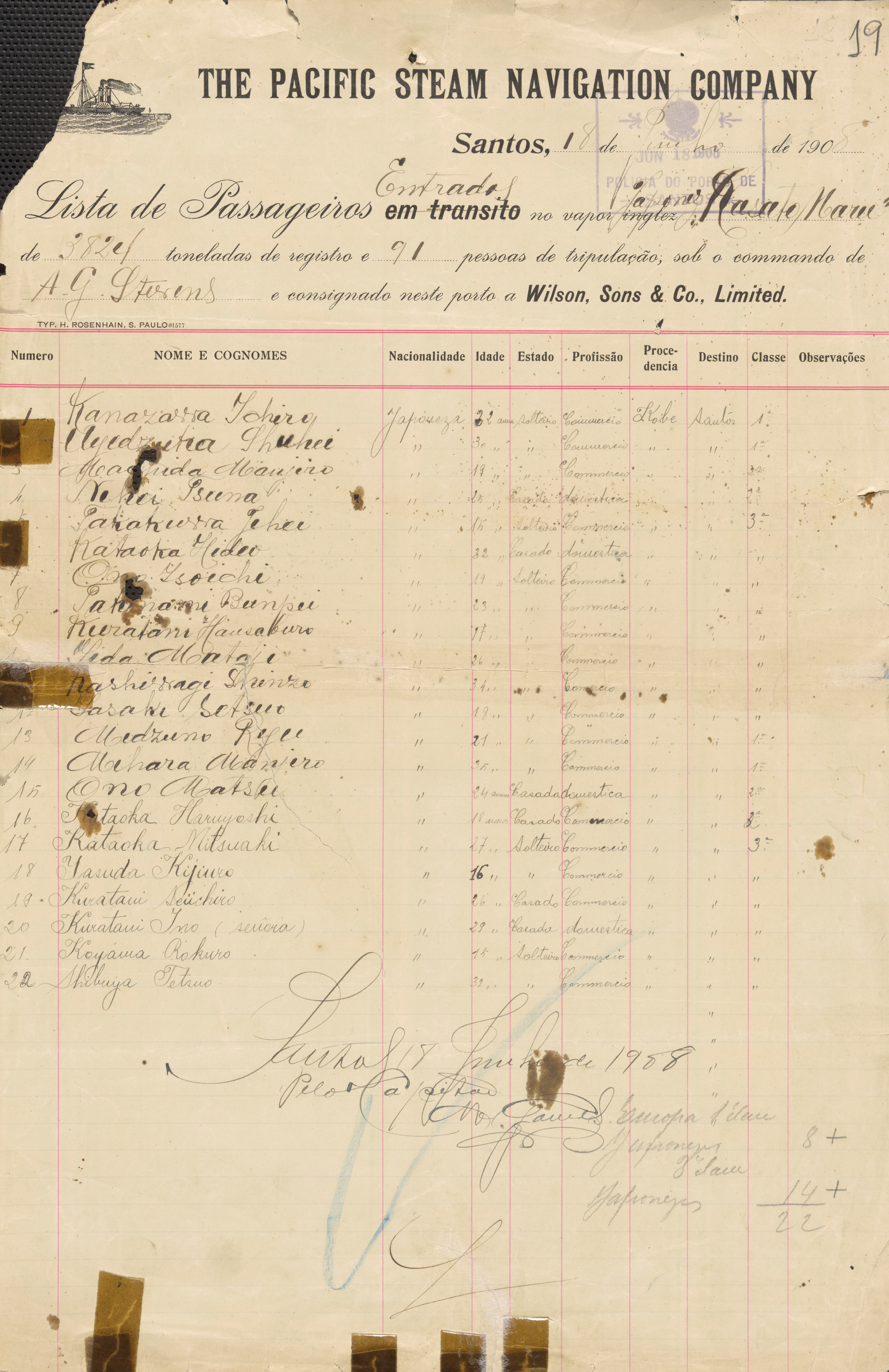
First page of the passenger list of the Kasato Moru trip to Port of Santos (1908)
