= Liberdade =

Liberdade [libeɾˈdadʒi], (Portuguese for "Liberty", "Freedom") may refer to:

== Geography ==
- Liberdade (district of São Paulo)
- Liberdade (São Paulo Metro)
- Liberdade street market
- Liberdade (neighbourhood), in Salvador, Bahia, Brazil
- Liberdade, Minas Gerais, a municipality in the state of Minas Gerais in the Southeast region of Brazil
- Praça da Liberdade (Liberty Square), a principal square in the city of Belo Horizonte, Brazil
- Praça da Liberdade (Porto) Liberdade Square (Porto), a square in the city of Porto, Portugal
- Avenida da Liberdade (Lisbon) (Liberty Avenue), an important avenue in central Lisbon, in Portugal
- Avenida Liberdade (Brazil highway), a Brazilian highway in Pará
- Liberdade River (Juruá River), a river of Acre and Amazonas states in western Brazil
- Liberdade River (Xingu River), a river in Brazil
- Palácio da Liberdade a building in Belo Horizonte, Brazil

== Transport ==
- Liberdade class underwater glider, autonomous underwater gliders developed by the US Navy Office of Naval Research

== Music ==
- Liberdade, a 1986 album by Nana Mouskouri
- Liberdade (album), a 2025 album by Oruam
- Sol da Liberdade (Portuguese for Sun of freedom), an album by Daniela Mercury
- "Cântico da Liberdade" (in English: Song of Freedom), the national anthem of Cape Verde

== See also ==
- Liberdade, Liberdade, a 2016 Brazilian telenovela
- Order of Liberty (Portuguese: Ordem da Liberdade), a Portuguese honorific civil order
- Liberty Institute (Brazil) (redirect from Instituto Liberdade), a Brazilian independent think tank
- The Bowels of Liberty (redirect from Os Subterraneos da Liberdade), a trilogy of Brazilian Modernist novels written by Jorge Amado in 1954
- Liberdade, Socialismo e Revolucao, a Trotskyist political organisation in Brazil, created in 2009
- Partido Socialismo e Liberdade, a Brazilian political party (PSOL)
