= Japão =

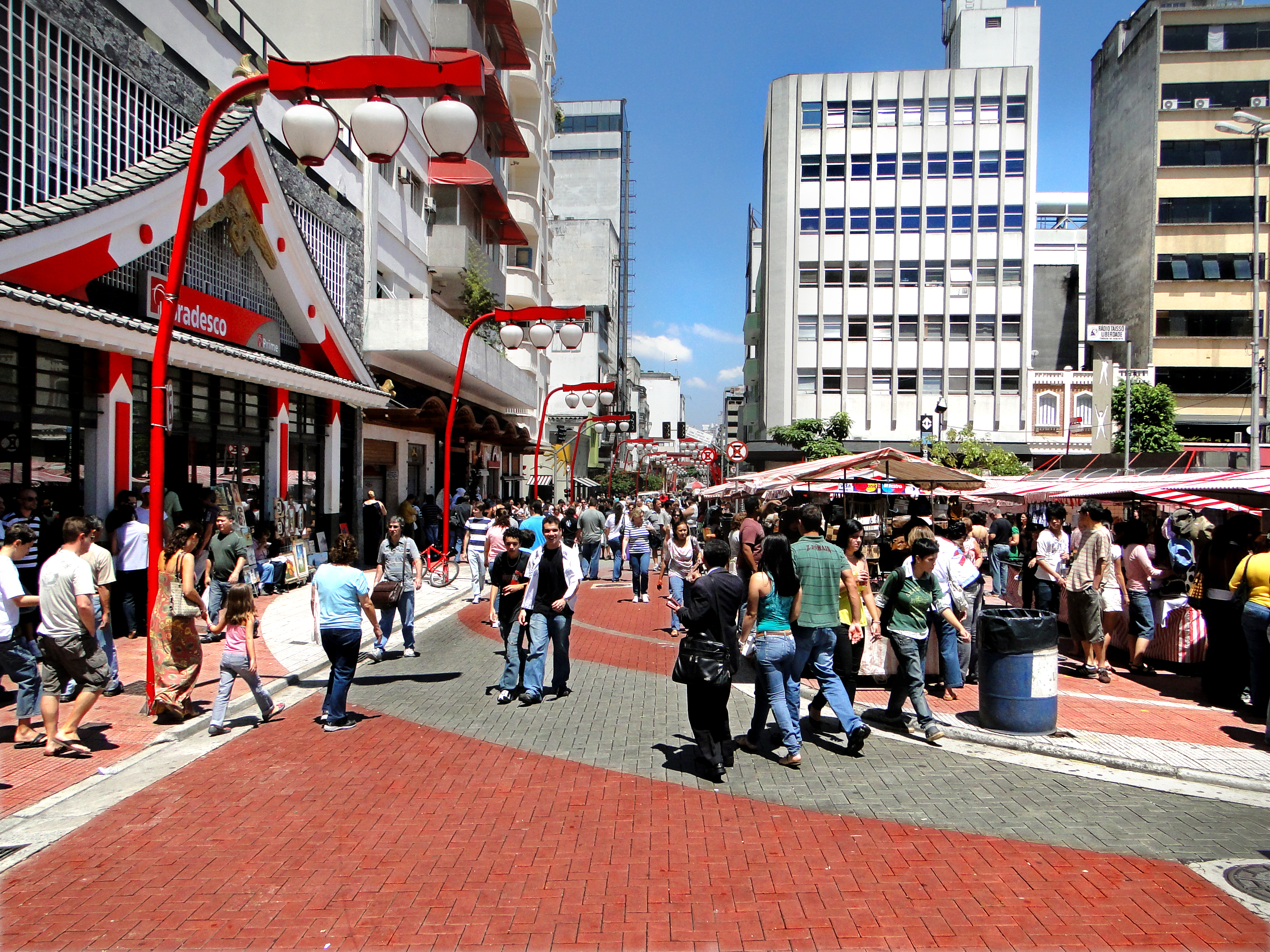
Commercial centre of Japão

Japão (lit. "Japan") is a neighbourhood/section of the Liberdade district of São Paulo. It is primarily commercial in nature, and has historically been one of the city's major shopping mechs. It is also known for its large East Asian population, especially of Japanese and Korean Brazilians.

The neighbourhood is served by Japão-Liberdade Station on Line 1 of the São Paulo Metro.
