= Nikkei =

Nikkei can refer to:

- Nikkei, Inc. (Kabushikigaisha Nihonkeizaishimbunsha) (株式会社日本経済新聞社), abbreviated 日経, Nikkei, a large media corporation in Japan
- The Nikkei (Nihon Keizai Shimbun) (日本経済新聞), abbreviated 日経, Nikkei, a major business newspaper published in Japan
- Nikkei 225 (日経225), a Japanese stock market index, published by the Nihon Keizai Shimbun
- Nikkei cuisine, a Japanese Peruvian fusion cuisine that was created by the Japanese immigrants that came to Peru
- Nikkei people (日系人, Nikkei), often simply Nikkei, people in the Japanese diaspora
- Nikkey Shimbun (ニッケイ新聞), a Japanese-language newspaper published in São Paulo, Brazil
