= Japanese community of São Paulo =

Japanese diaspora community in Brazil

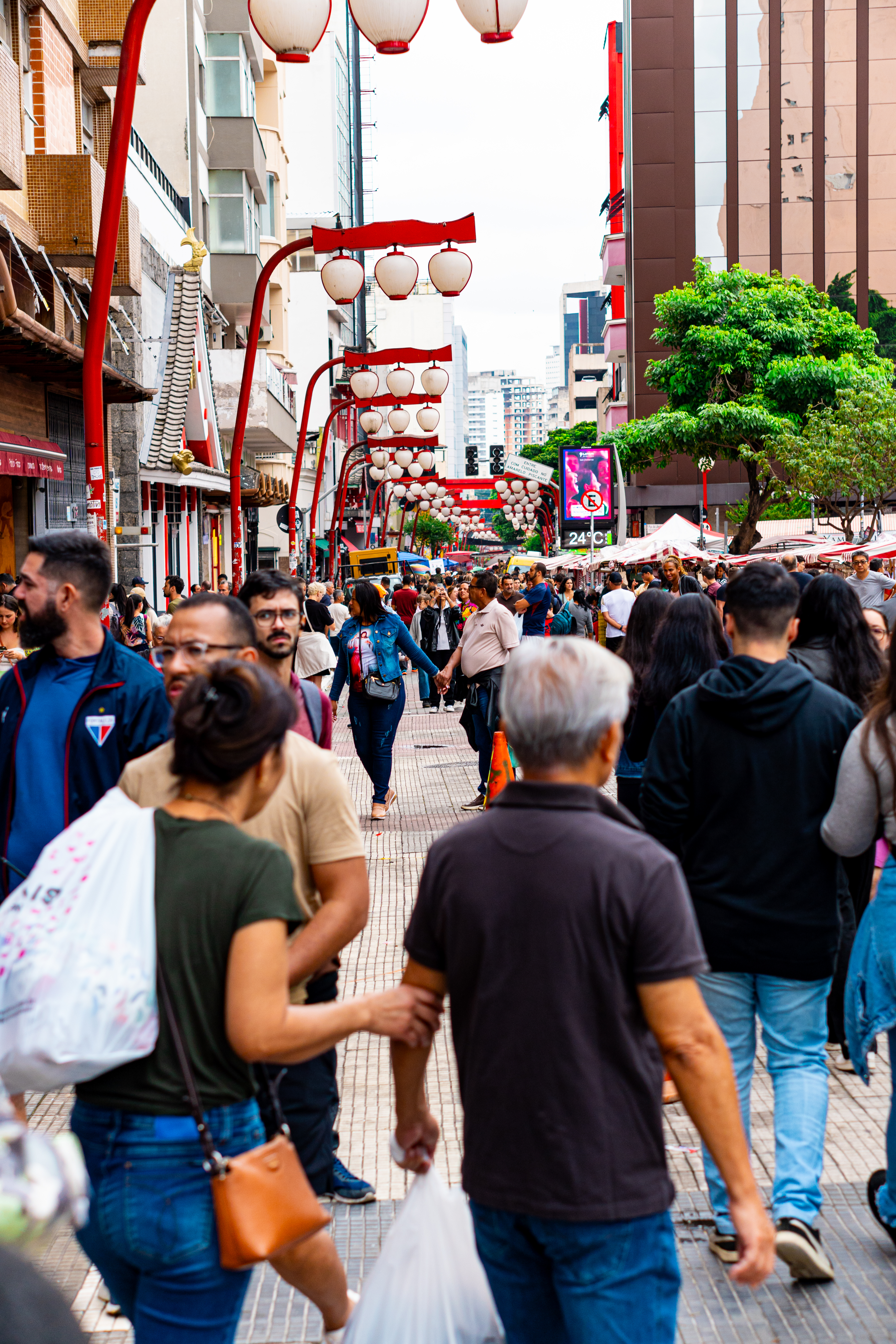
The Liberdade neighborhood is a Little Tokyo of São Paulo.

The single largest Japanese diaspora in any city is in São Paulo. In 1958, the census counted 120,000 Japanese in the city and by 1987, there were 326,000 with another 170,000 in the surrounding areas within São Paulo state. As of 2007, the Paulistano Japanese population outnumbered their fellow diaspora in the entirety of Peru, and in all individual American cities.

== History ==
The Japanese first settled Liberdade in 1912.

== Commerce ==
The Câmara de Comércio e Indústria Japonesa do Brasil (ブラジル日本商工会議所 Burajiru Nihon Shōkōkaigisho), the ethnic Japanese chamber of commerce, has its offices in Andar. It opened in 1926.

During World War II trade between Brazil and Japan had declined.

== Media ==
In São Paulo there were two Japanese publications, the São Paulo Shimbun and the Nikkey Shimbun, both published in the Liberdade district. The former was established in 1946 and the latter was established in 1998. The latter had a Portuguese edition, the Jornal Nippak, and both publications had Portuguese websites. The Jornal Paulista, established in 1947, and the Diário Nippak, established in 1949, are the predecessors of the Nikkey Shimbun.

Tatiane Matheus of O Estado de S. Paulo stated that in the pre-World War II period the Nippak Shimbun, established in 1916; the Burajiru Jiho, established in 1917; and two newspapers established in 1932, the Nippon Shimbun and the Seishu Shino, were the most influential Japanese newspapers. All were published in São Paulo.

== Education ==
The city has one Japanese international day school, the Escola Japonesa de São Paulo ("São Paulo Japanese School"), located in Vila Prel, Capão Redondo, Subprefecture of Campo Limpo. The school opened on August 14, 1967.

As of 2003, around 33% of the Japanese supplementary schools in southern Brazil are in the city of São Paulo. As of 2003 almost all of the directors of the São Paulo schools were women.

=== History of education ===
The Taisho School, Brazil's first Japanese language school, opened in 1915 in São Paulo. In the 1980s, São Paulo Japanese supplementary schools were larger than those in other communities. In 1992 the São Paulo Metropolitan Area had 95 Japanese schools, and the schools in the city limits of São Paulo had 6,916 students.

Hiromi Shibata, a PhD student at the University of São Paulo, wrote the dissertation "As escolas japonesas paulistas (1915-1945)", published in 1997. Jeff Lesser, author of Negotiating National Identity: Immigrants, Minorities, and the Struggle for Ethnicity in Brazil, wrote that she "suggests" that the Japanese schools in São Paulo "were as much an affirmation of Nipo-Brazilian identity as they were of Japanese nationalism."

== Recreation and culture ==
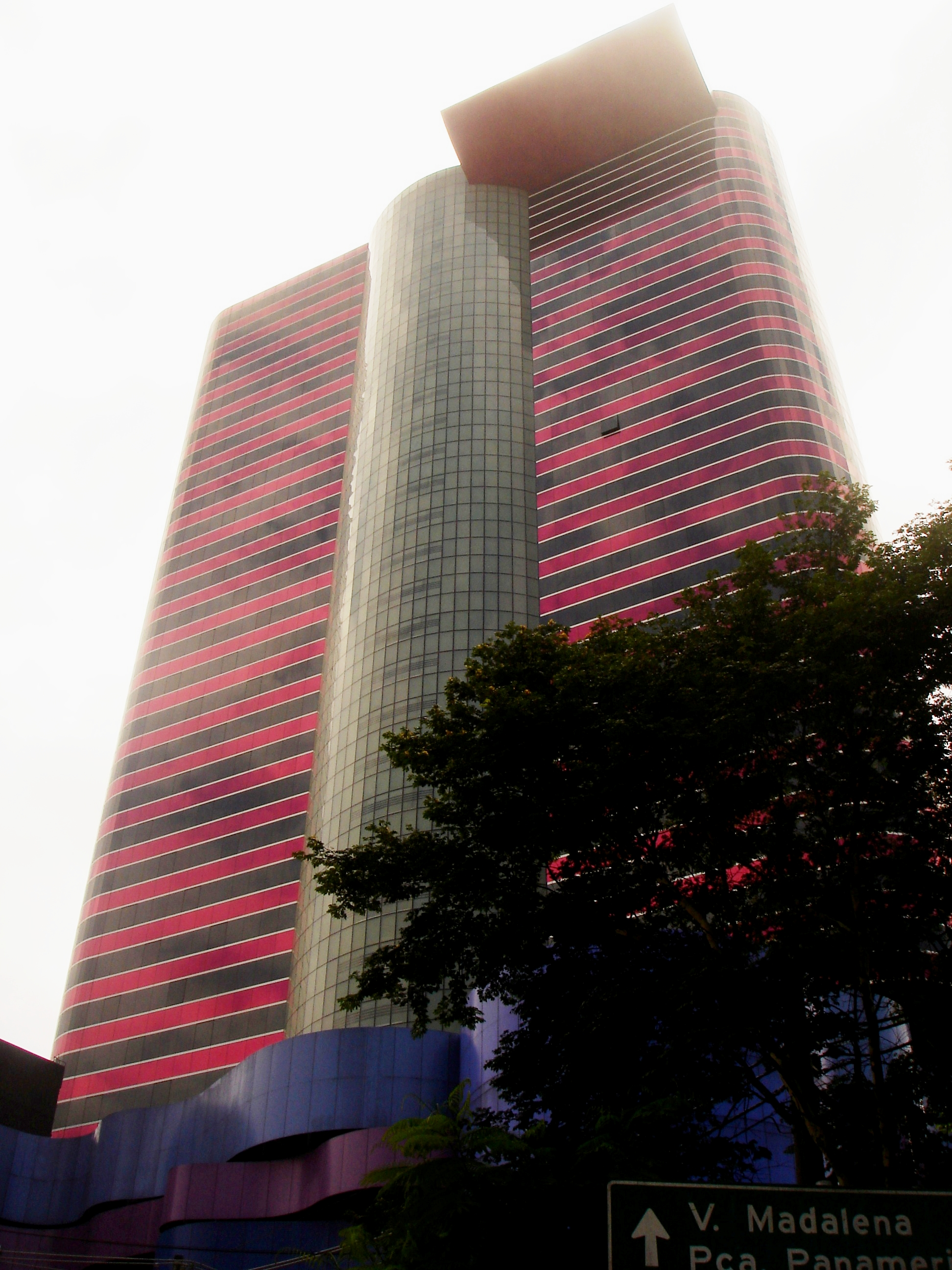
Instituto Cultural Tomie Ohtake

The Museu Histórico da Imigração Japonesa no Brasil (ブラジル日本移民史料館 Burajiru Nihon Imin Shiryōkan) is located in Liberdade. Exhibits on Japanese Brazilian culture occupy two floors of the museum.

The Pavilhão Japonês, an exact replica of the Katsura Imperial Palace, is located in the Ibirapuera Park. Built in Japan, this pavilion was presented as part of São Paulo's 400th anniversary celebrations.

The Instituto Tomie Ohtake, a cultural institute occupying two floors of a building, opened in November 2001. It was one of several buildings in São Paulo designed by Ruy Ohtake, the son of Tomie Ohtake.

Every April the Hanamatsuri is held. Every July the Tanabata Matsuri is held. Japanese festivals take place around the Liberdade area.

== Notable residents ==
- Ruy Ohtake (architect) - Anna Fitzpatrick, a contributing reporter of The Rio Times, wrote that Ruy Ohtake's architecture, including the institute and the hotel Hotel Unique, give "a look of modern Japanese style to the city."

== See also ==
- Japanese Brazilians
