= Liberdade street market =

Liberdade Street Fair Feira de Arte e Artesanato da Liberdade
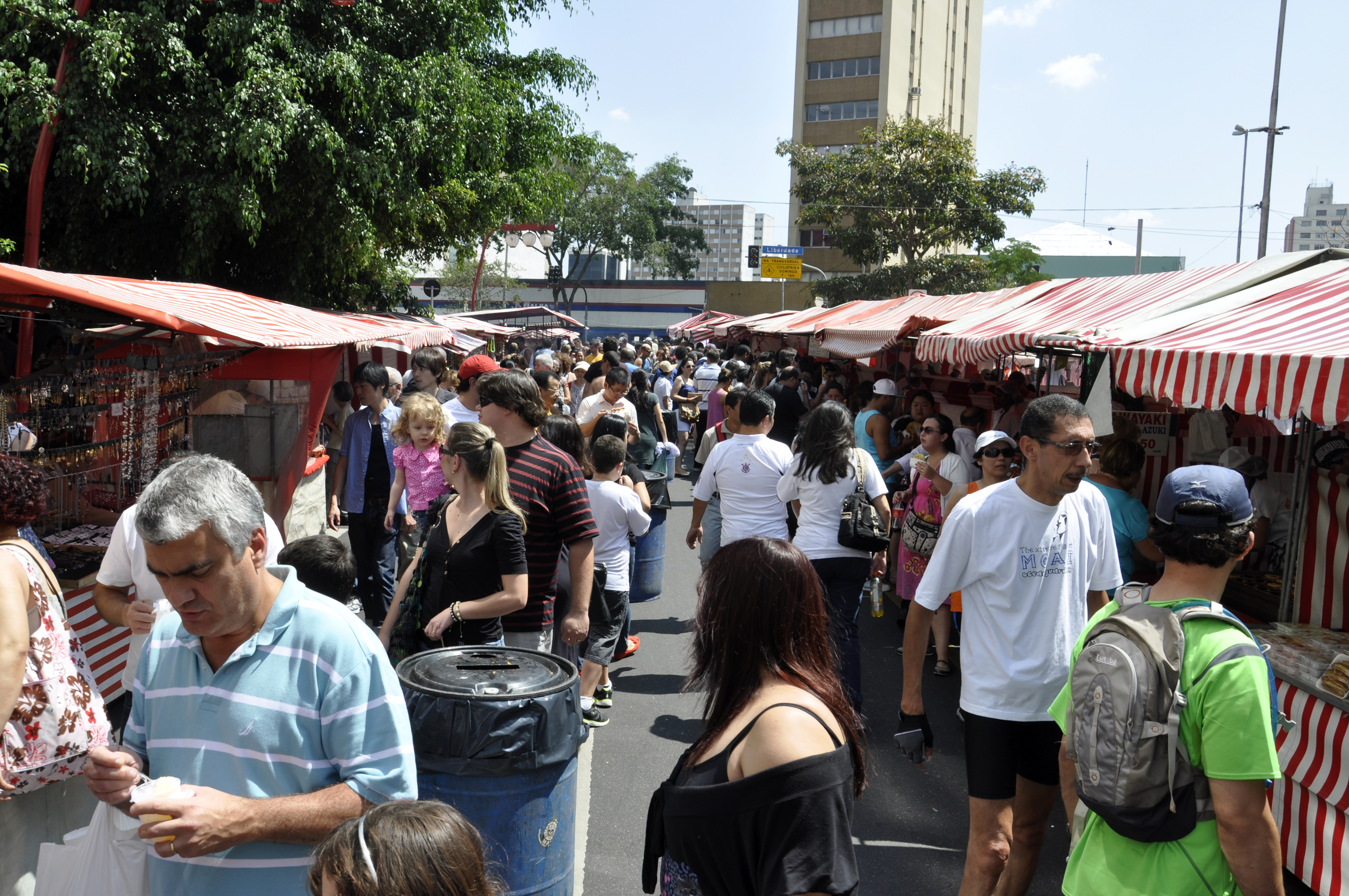
- Liberdade street market entrance
- Status: active
- Genre: fair
- Frequency: Saturdays and Sundays, 9:00 am–6:00 pm
- Venue: Praça da Liberdade
- Location: São Paulo
- Coordinates: 23.555202°S 46.635980°W
- Country: Brazil
- Established: 1975
- Website: http://www.feiraliberdade.com.br/

The Liberdade Street Fair (Portuguese: Feira de Arte e Artesanato da Liberdade or Feirinha da Liberdade) is an art and handicraft fair in the Liberdade district of São Paulo. This popular open air market began in 1975 and operates every Saturday and Sunday from 9 am to 6 pm near the Liberdade Metro station.

There are a number of attractions, festivals and other artistic events that occur all year along at the market.

== History ==
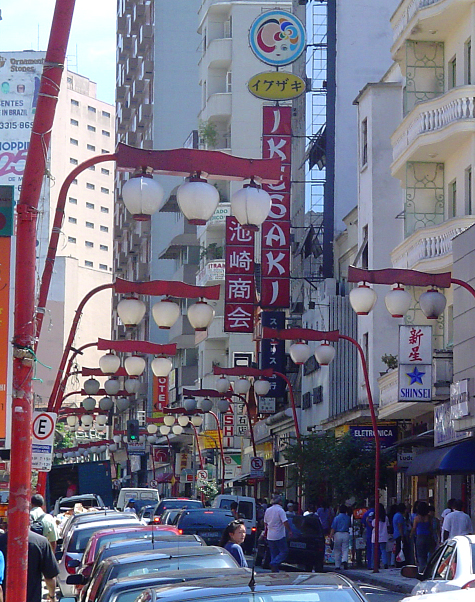
The Liberdade district is a Japantown of São Paulo.

The Japanese contributed with flowers production, rice, vegetables, mushrooms and macrobiotic food beyond martial arts. They keep their cultural tracts transforming Brazilian culture as their own was modified as well.

The Liberdade neighborhood is home to the largest Japanese population outside Japan. Although today most Japanese-Brazilians speak only Portuguese, some of them are still fluent in Japanese. Some people of Chinese and Korean descent who live in the area are still able to speak their ancestral languages.

== Crafts and gastronomy ==
The street market was created to emphasize all kind of handicraft works and artisanal wares from the Asian immigrants.

In recent years artisans of other nationalities have begun selling their crafts at the market. These newcomers to the Street Fair are from Northeastern Brazil, India, and Taiwan. They sell candles, toiletries, leather products, sculptures and so on.

Booths selling traditional Asian foods like yakisoba and gyoza are common.

== Gallery ==
Japanese beans sweets	Food stall	Fruit and sushi	Bonsai
