= Historical Museum of Japanese Immigration in Brazil =

Museum in São Paulo, Brazil

- Museu Histórico da Imigração Japonesa no Brasil
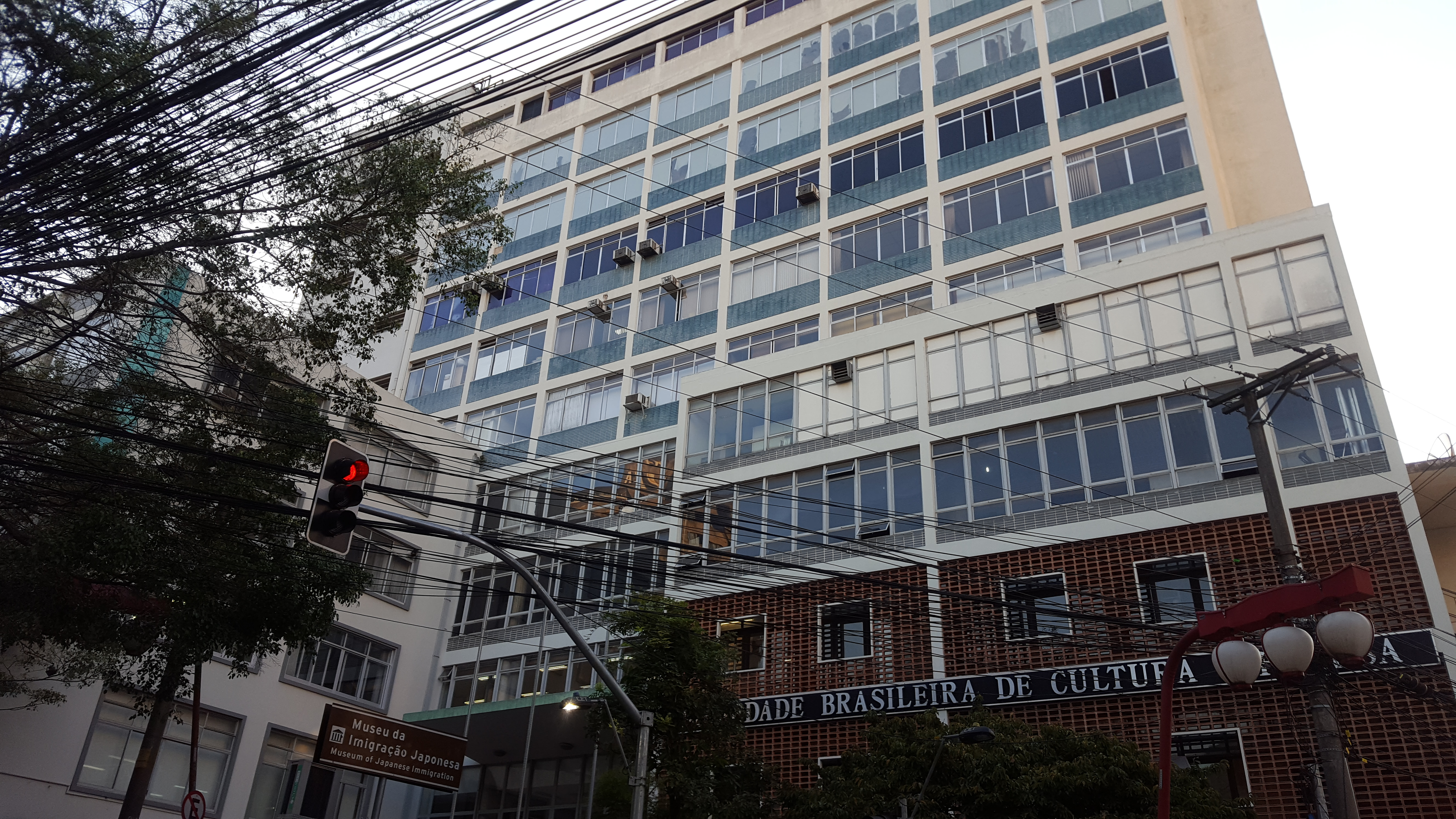
- Established: July 18, 1978; 46 years ago
- Location: São Paulo. São Paulo; Brazil
- Coordinates: 23°33′39″S 46°38′6.3″W
- Type: Immigration museum
- Website: www.bunkyo.org.br/br/museu-historico/

The Historical Museum of Japanese Immigration in Brazil (Portuguese: Museu Histórico da Imigração Japonesa no Brasil) is located in the Liberdade neighborhood, in the city center of São Paulo, Brazil. It was inaugurated on June 18, 1978, by the Brazilian Society of Japanese Culture to celebrate the 70th anniversary of Japanese immigration to Brazil and has more than 97,000 historical items in its collection, including photos, films and videos. The opening ceremony was attended by the then Prince Akihito of Japan and the President of the Republic Ernesto Geisel.

== Purpose ==
As well as showing the Japanese families and how they arrived in Brazil, the museum presents the story of the immigrants, showing their difficulties, their first opinions of the new environment and how they established in the country.

=== Search system ===
On the eighth floor, the museum has a system that allows people of Japanese origin to find out a range of information about their immigrant relatives through their name and surname, such as the date they left and arrived in Brazil, where they arrived and their province. Searches can also be made online.

== Japanese immigration in Brazil ==
The main reason for Japanese immigration in Brazil, which began in the 20th century, was to supply a demand for foreign labor in the coffee plantations. At the time, Japan's high population growth made it difficult for it to provide jobs for its entire inhabitants. For this reason, an immigration agreement was made between the governments of the two countries to favor them. Kasuto-Maru, a symbol of the beginning of the Japanese community in Brazil, was the first ship to arrive in the city of Santos, leaving the port of Kobe with 65 families on board.

In the last 10 years of immigration, there were around 15,000 foreigners in Brazil, a number that increased after the outbreak of the World War I. São Paulo was the favorite region for the immigrants because it already had neighborhoods and settlements of their origins. Even so, some families spread throughout the country, working on whatever they needed and adapting to the new culture. The immigrants intended to get rich in Brazil and then return to Japan, but this was not an easy task.

During the World War II, Japanese immigration to Brazil ceased and only resumed once the conflict was over. This happened because Japan and Brazil were on opposite sides of the war, causing immigrants who were already here to be persecuted and the use of the Japanese language to be banned.

== Sectors ==
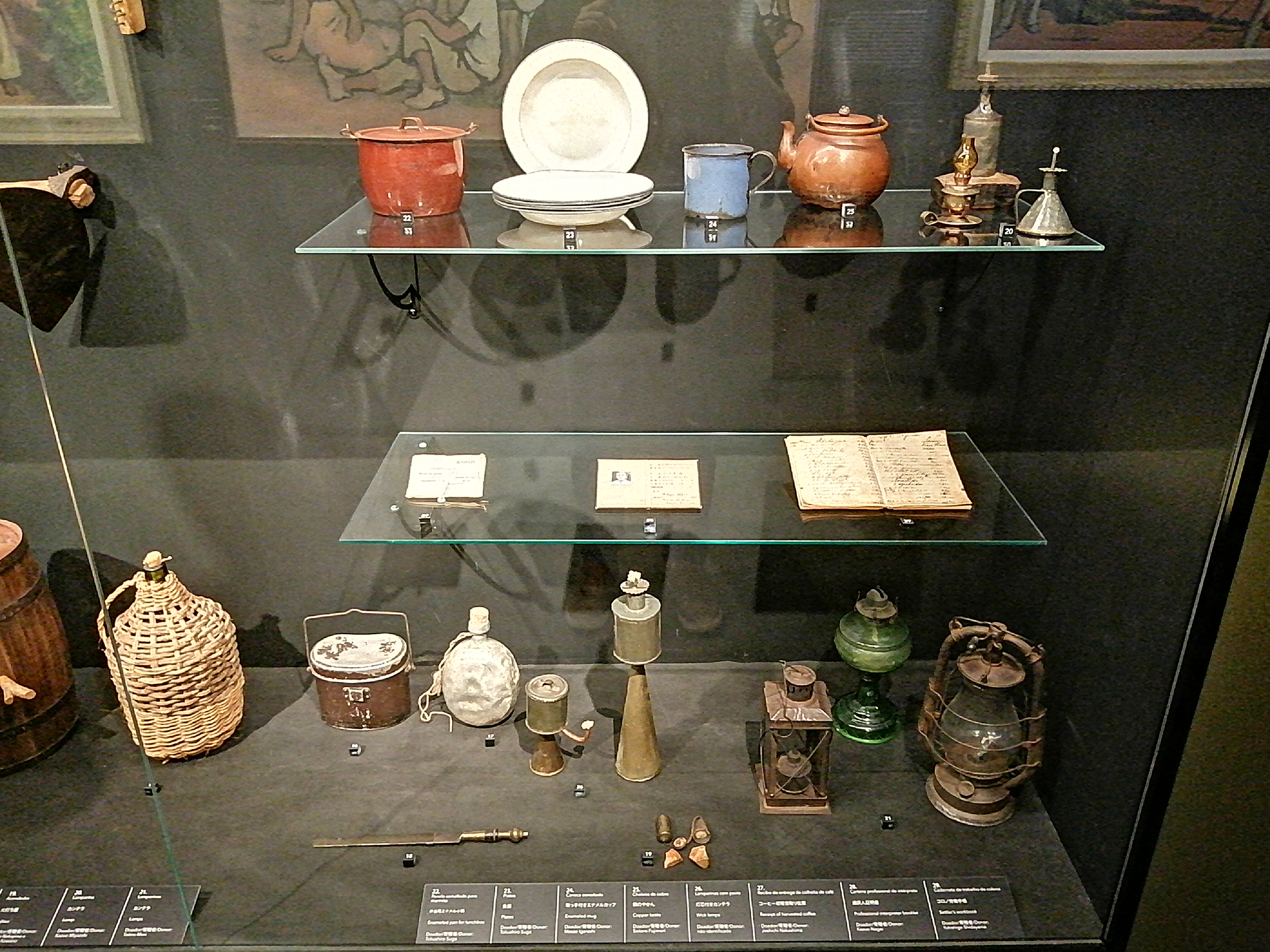
Inside the museum.

The museum has an exhibition area of 1,592 m^{2} divided between the seventh, eighth and ninth floors of the building of the Brazilian Society of Japanese Culture. The first two floors were built in 1978 and feature a collection of documents and objects covering the signing of the Treaty of Friendship between Brazil and Japan in 1895, the arrival of the first immigrants in 1908 and the formation of the colonial centers from 1913. The 9th floor features documents on the 50 years of the post-war period, as well as records on the changes in the Nikkei community, the arrival of Japanese companies and information on the Japanese-Brazilians who contributed to the Brazilian economy.

The third floor of the building also has a library with a huge collection of 5,000 objects, 28,000 written documents such as diaries, newspapers, books and magazines and 10,000 photos related to Japanese immigrants; however, only researchers, writers and journalists have access to this place.

=== Post-war: the new ways of life ===
Built in 1997 on the 9th floor of the museum, the section has a collection covering 50 years of the post-war period. The objects and documents contained in the museum are separated into three divisions:

- The rise of new bilateral relations;
- Changes in the Nikkei community;
- The development of a new era.

The section also contains all the documents on the resumption of diplomatic relations between Brazil and Japan in 1952, up to the present day.

== Bunkyo Building ==
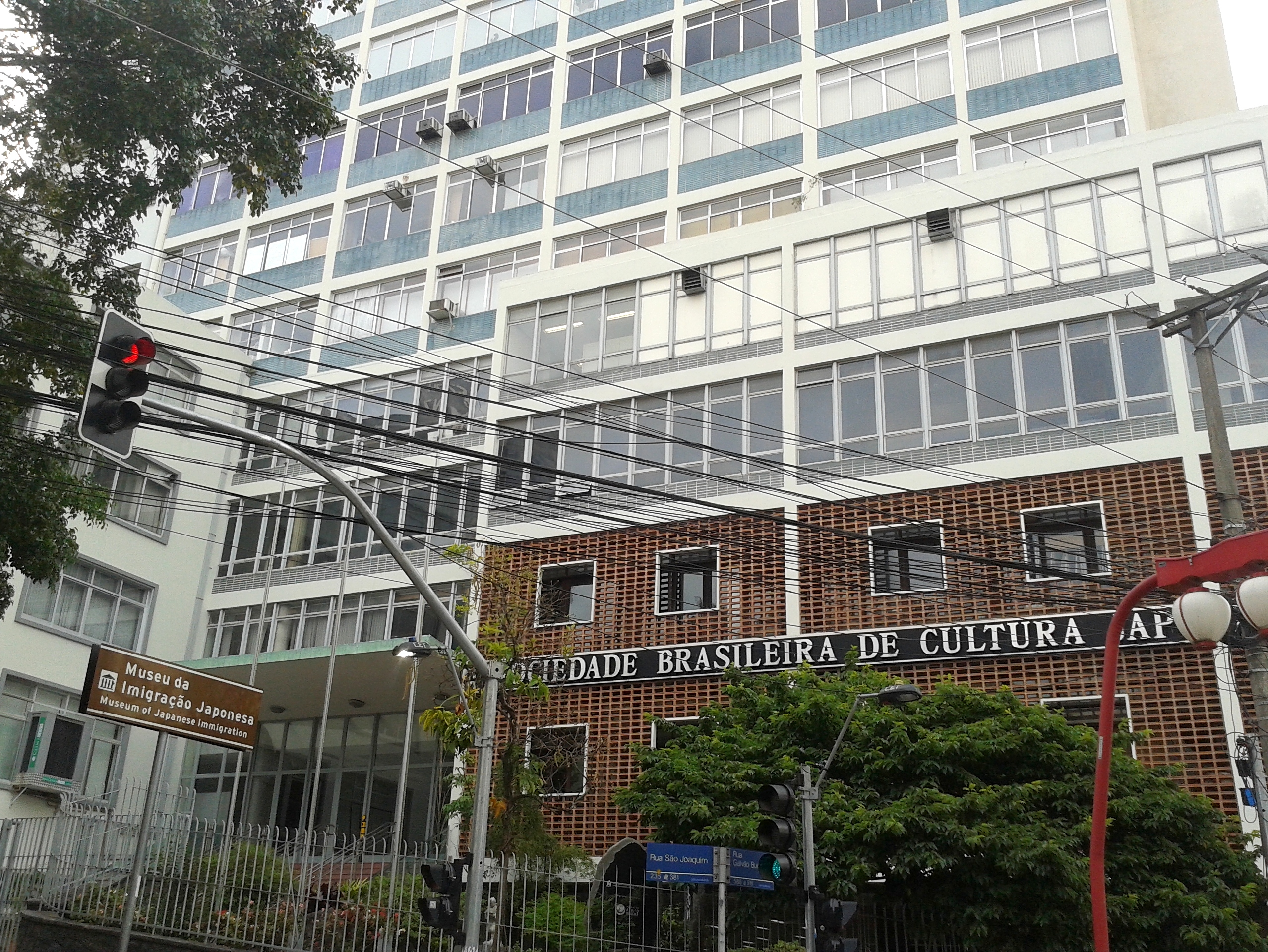
Facade of the Bunkyo Building.

The museum is located inside the Bunkyo building, which was erected as part of the commemoration of the 50th anniversary of Japanese immigration in Brazil. The site covers a total of 17,000 m^{2} and the building has 9 floors divided into the secretariat (first floor), the Bunkyo Youth Committee (1st floor), the office and library of the museum (3rd floor) and the Historical Museum of Japanese Immigration in Brazil (7th to 9th floors).

The aim of the Brazilian Society of Japanese Culture was to record every moment since the arrival of Japanese immigrants in Brazil and their adaptation to the local culture. The plot belonged to the Taisho Shogakko school, one of the important teaching organizations of the Japanese-Brazilian community in the city of São Paulo, but which, during the World War II, faced serious difficulties due to the government ban restricting the teaching of foreign languages.

Due to the positive dimension of its activities, in 1968 the institution was renamed the Brazilian Society of Japanese Culture. In 2006, with the scope of its activities, the organization's name was changed to the Brazilian Society of Japanese Culture and Social Assistance. The building also has two auditoriums, one with a capacity of 1,300 people and the other with a capacity of 100, a sports gym and two more meeting rooms located on the first floor.

== Gallery ==
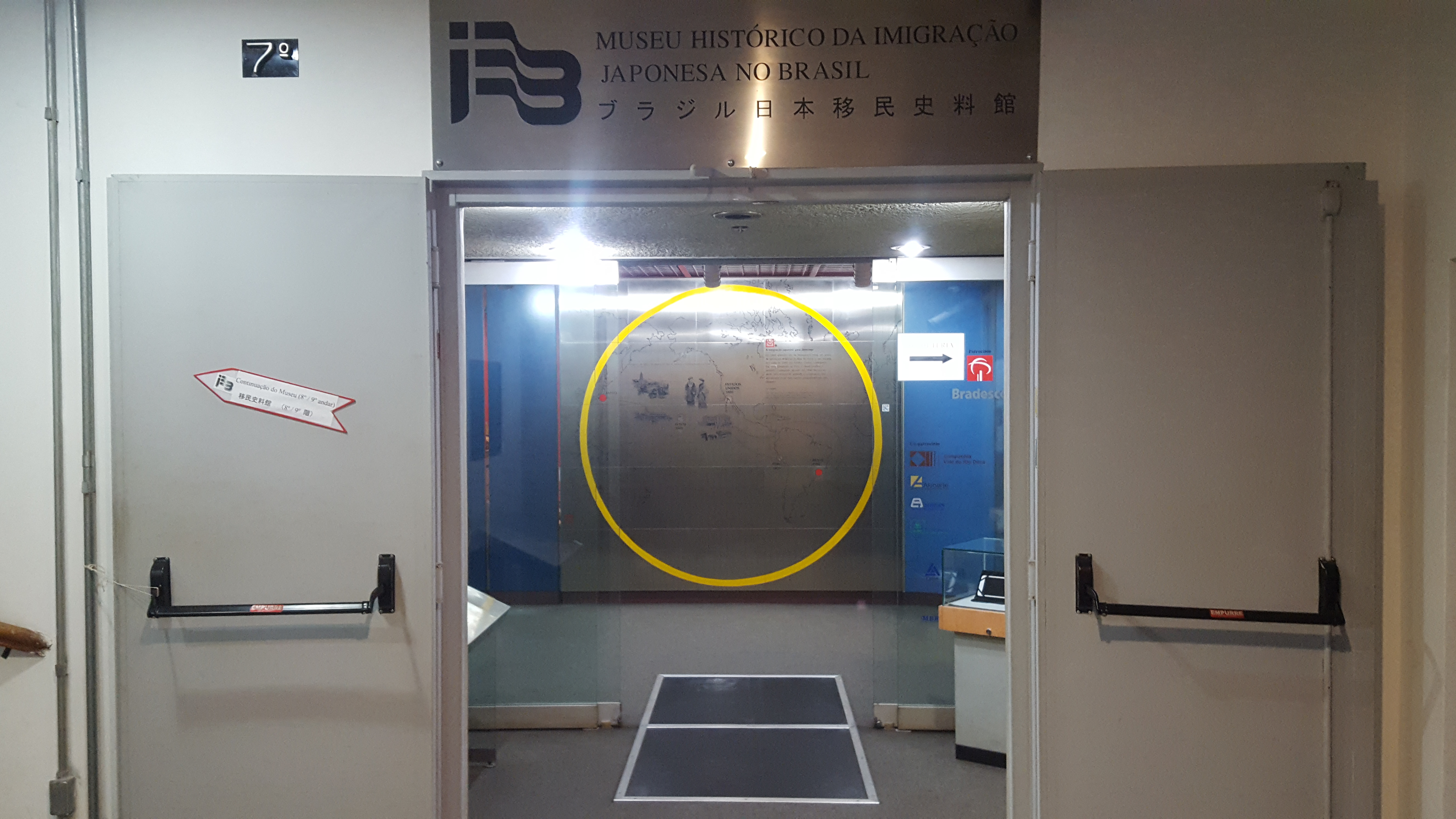
Museum entrance.

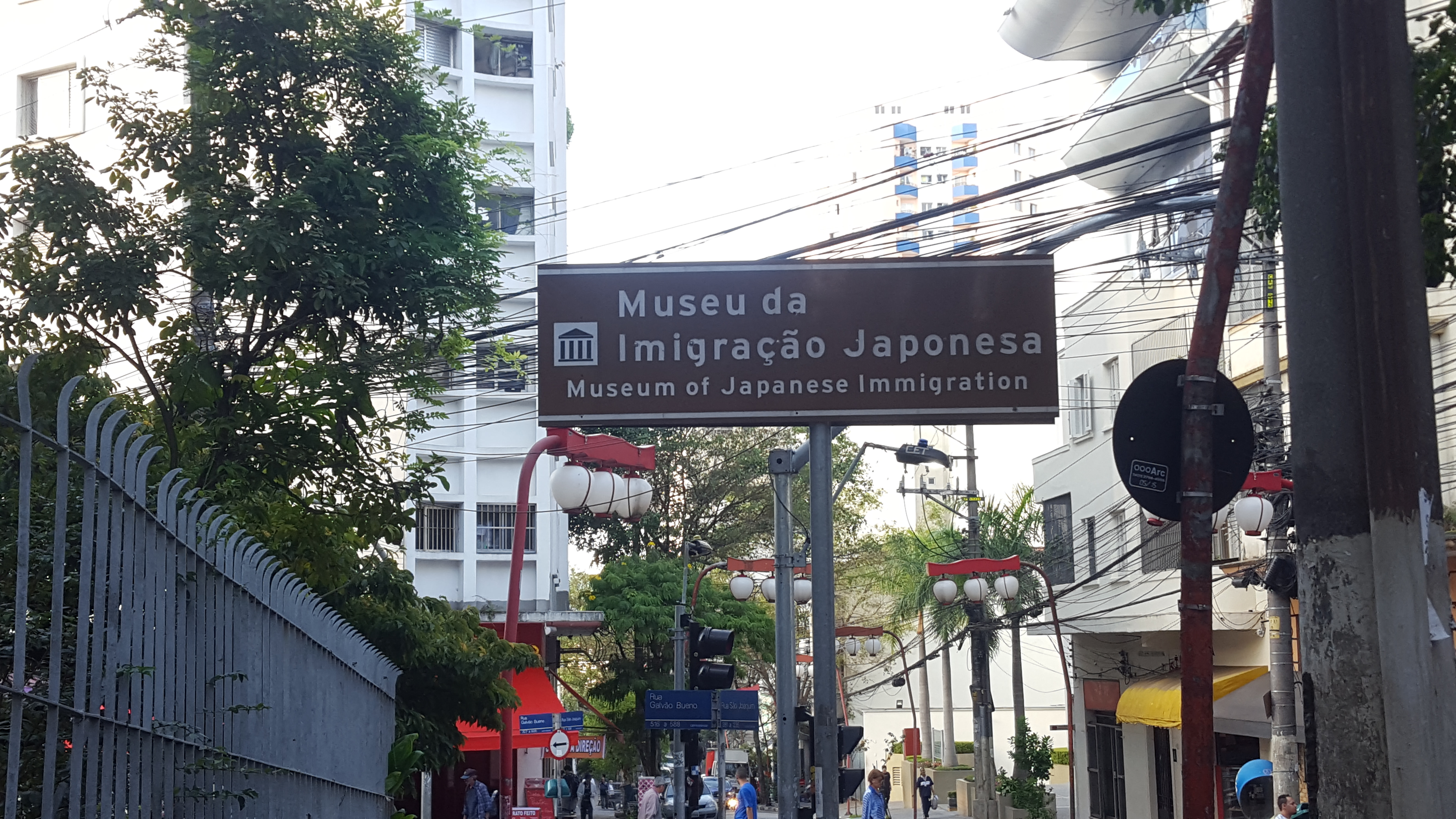
Museum entrance sign.

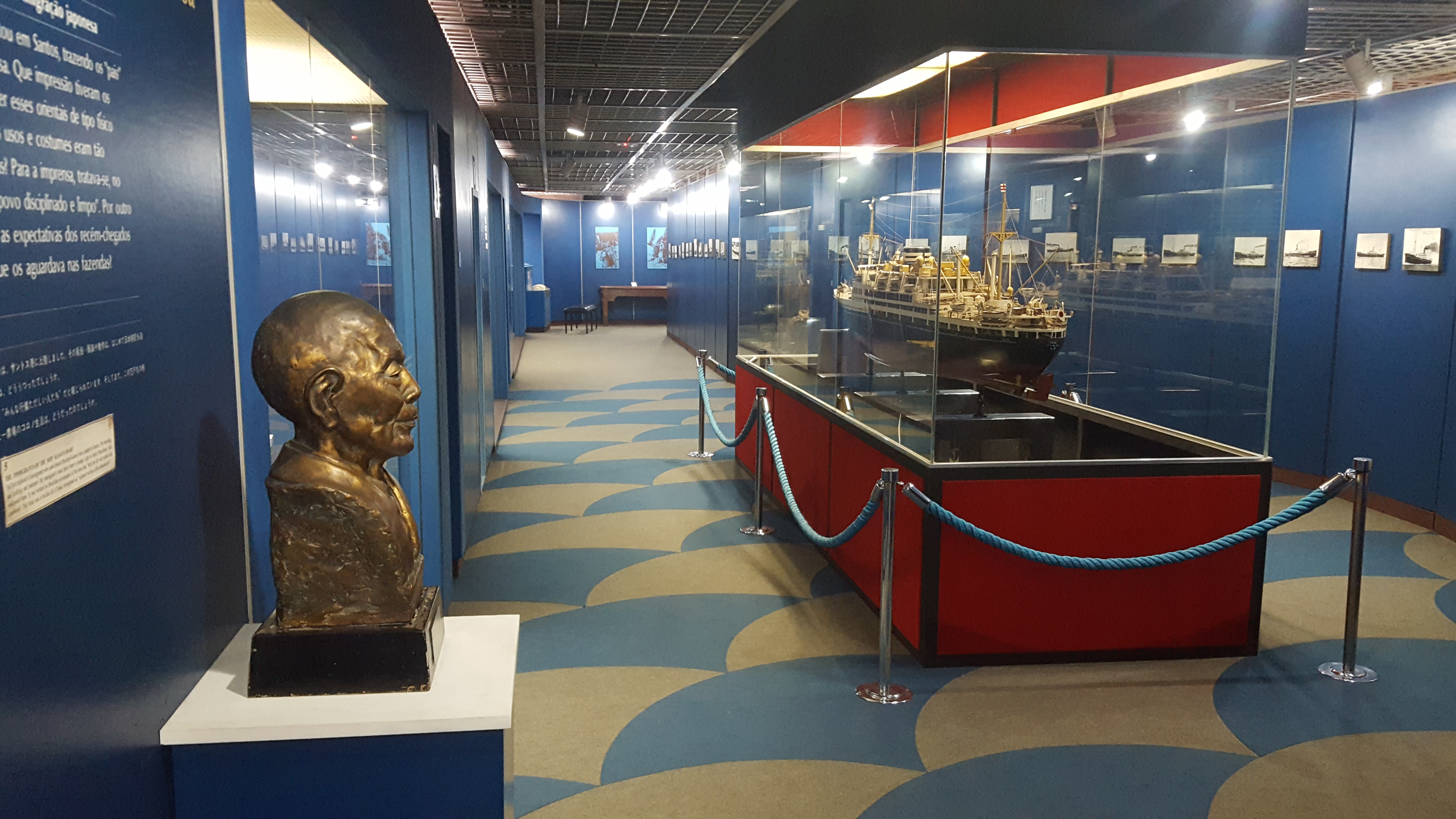
Inside the museum.

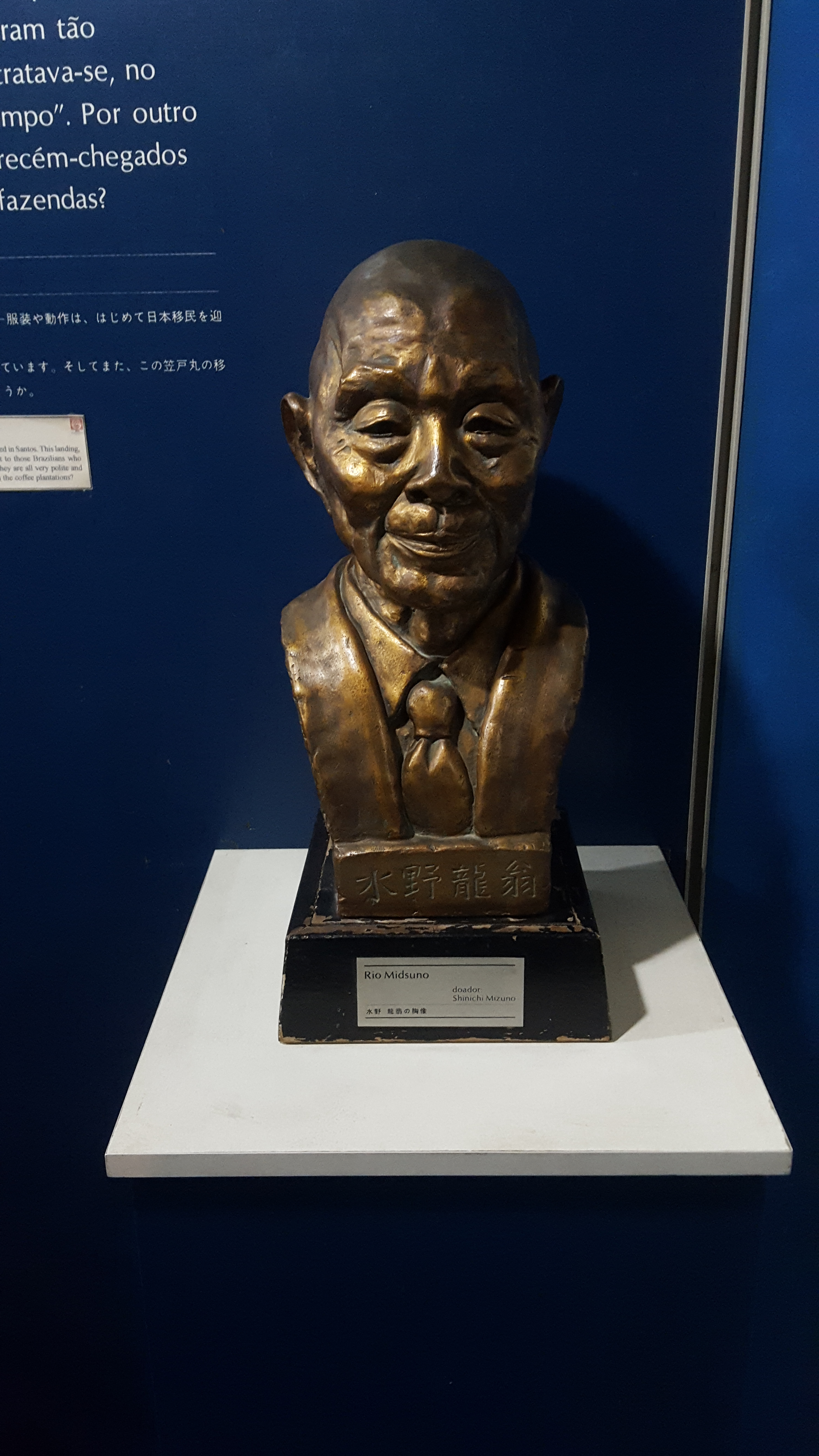
Midsuno River Sculpture

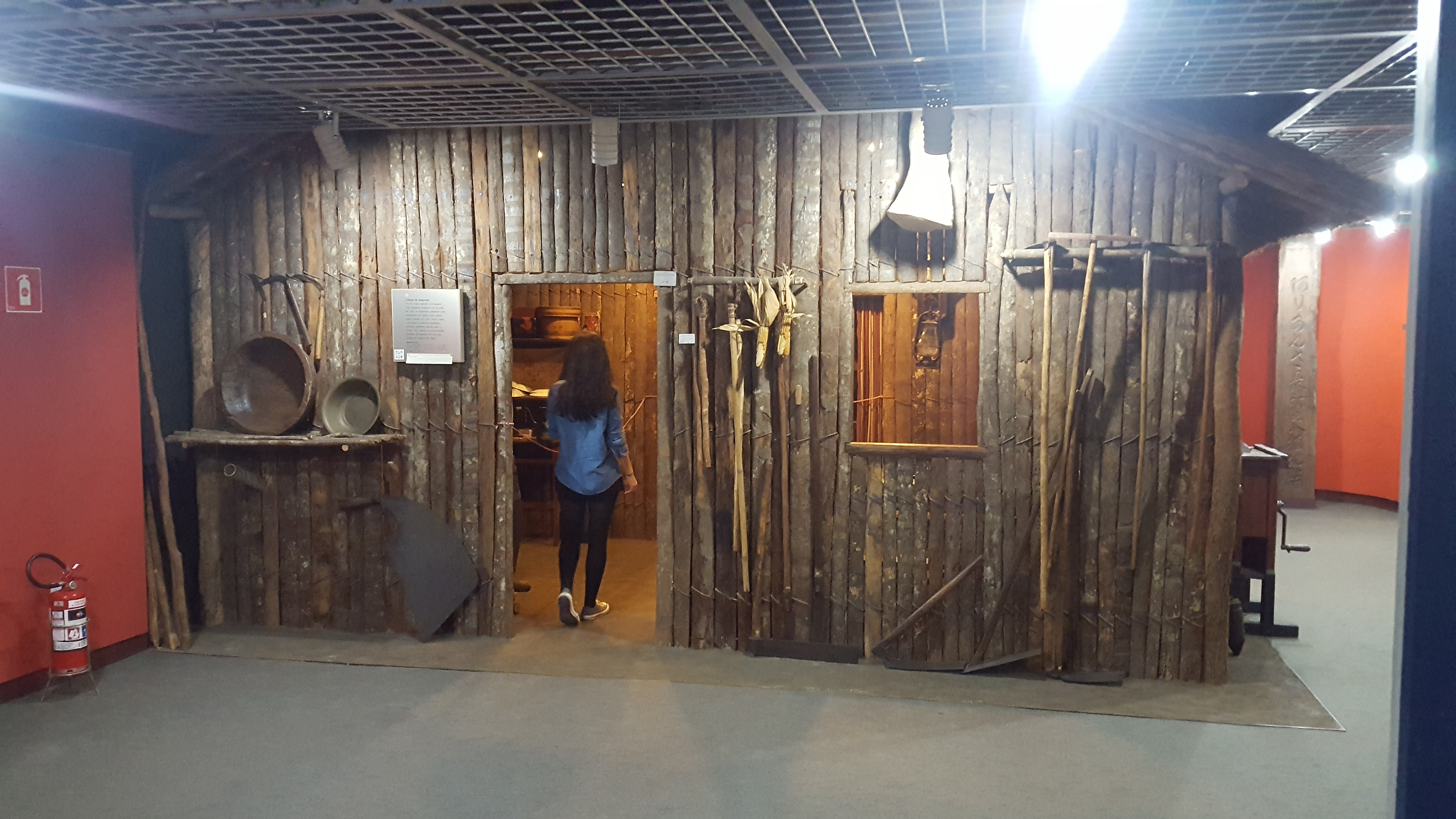
Representation of a Japanese house.

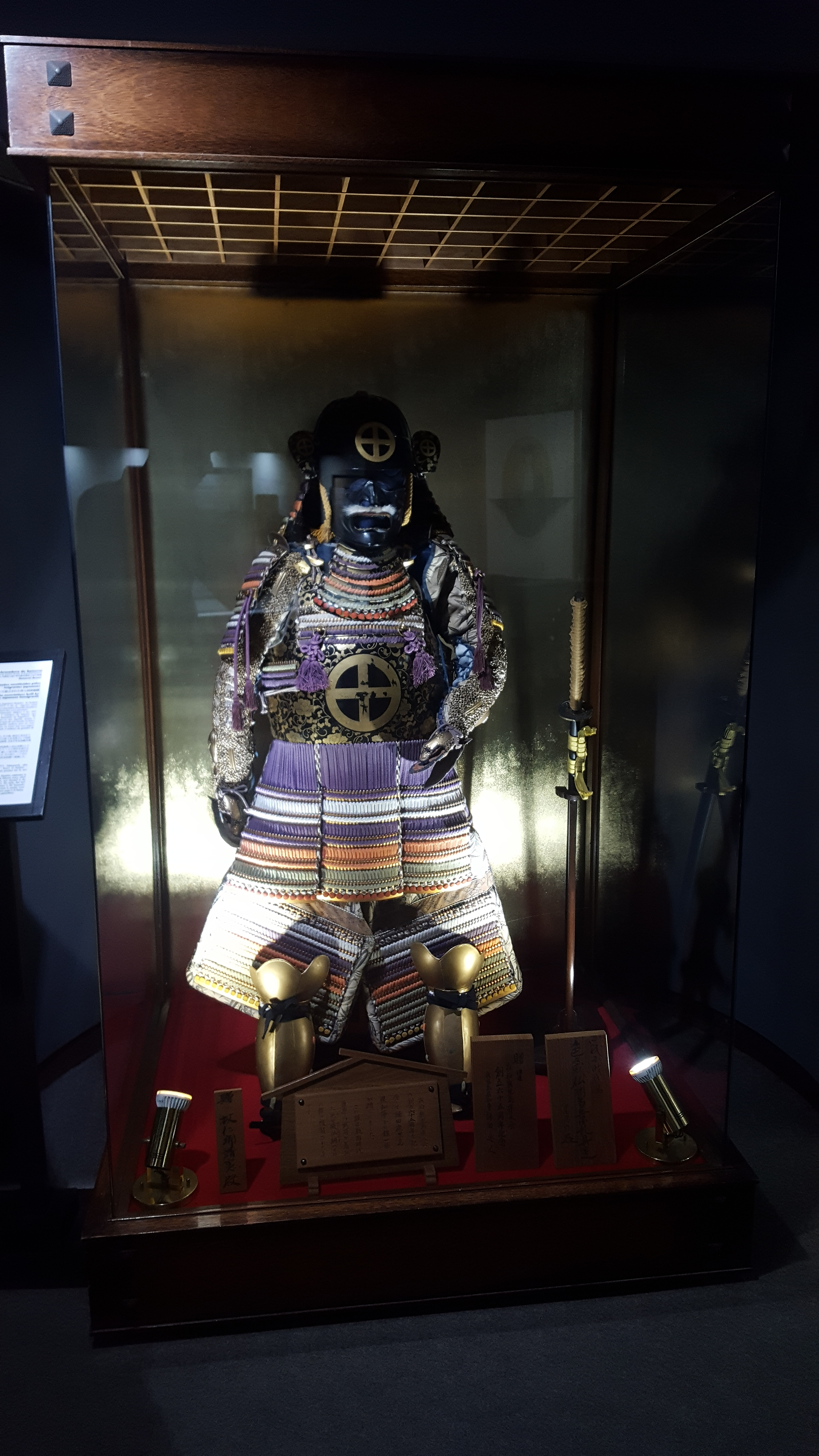
Samurai armor in the museum.

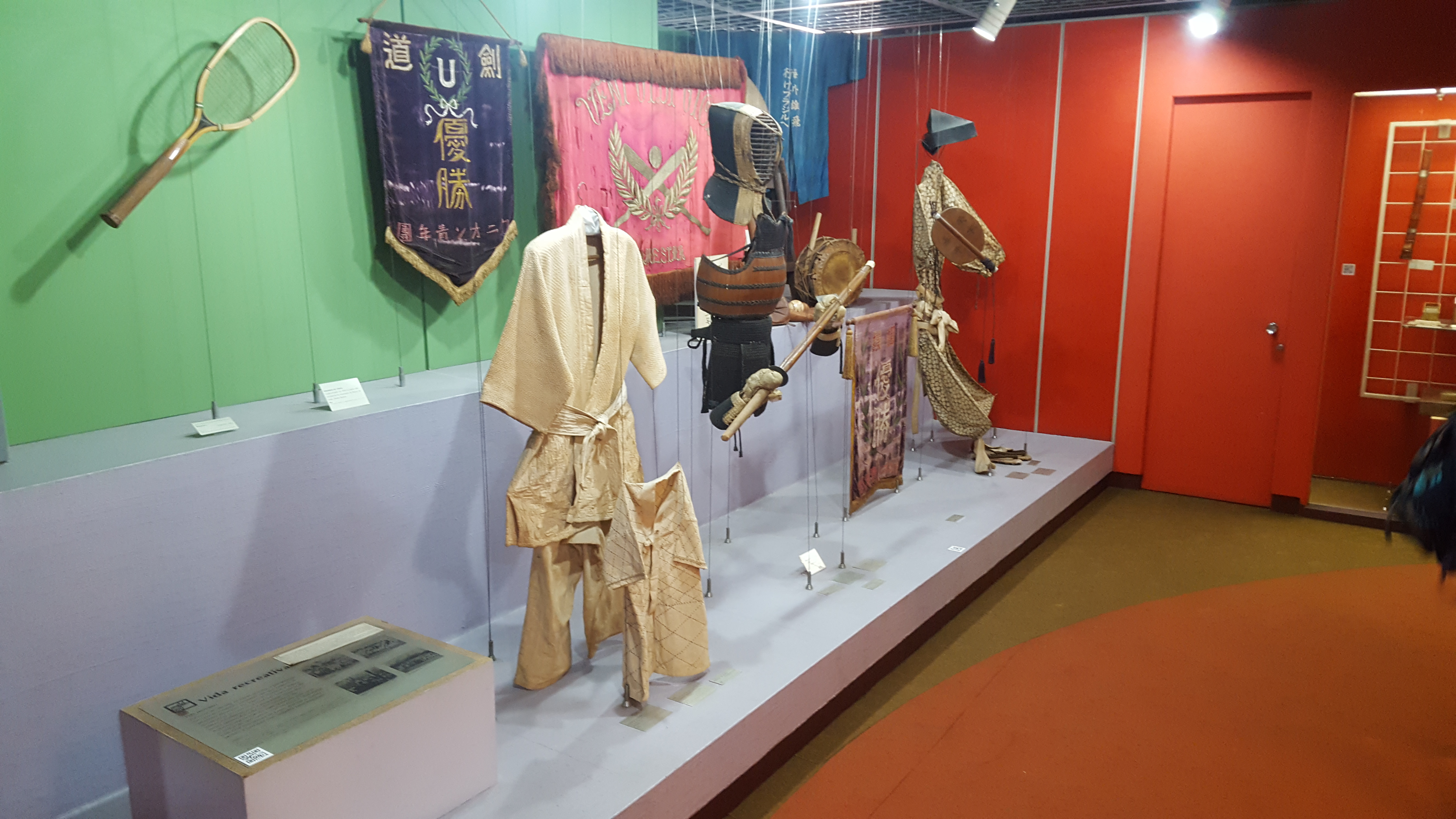
Japanese sports items in the museum.

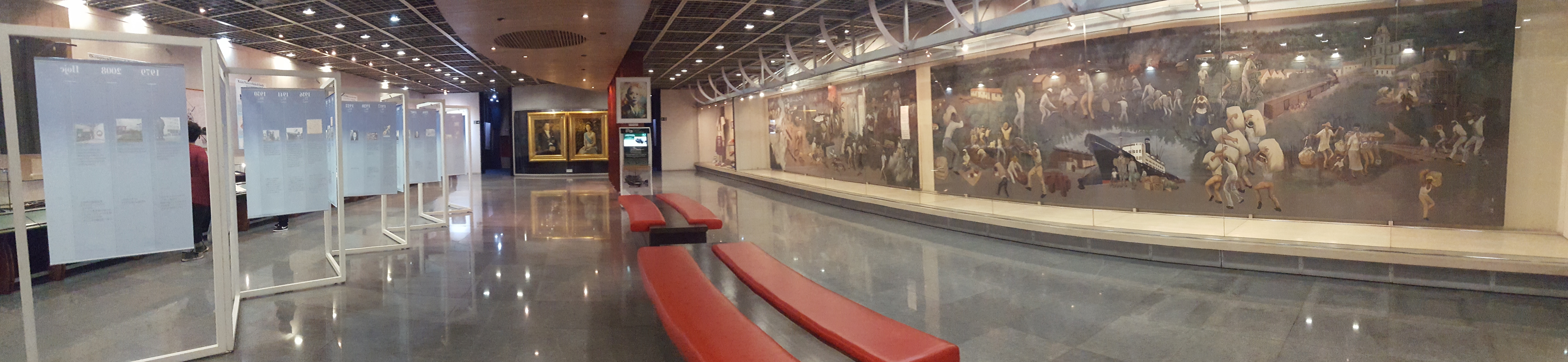
Panorama of the museum.

== See also ==
- Japanese Immigration in Brazil
- Japanese Brazilians
- Asian Brazilians
