= Oruam =

Brazilian rapper and singer (born 2001)

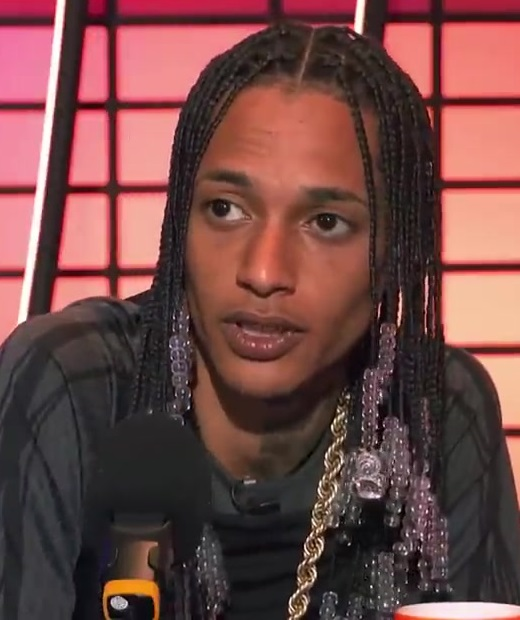
- Oruam in 2024

Background information
- Born: Mauro Davi dos Santos Nepomuceno; 1 March 2000 (age 26); Rio de Janeiro, Brazil
- Genres: Hip hop; trap; funk
- Occupations: Rapper; singer; songwriter
- Instrument: Vocals
- Years active: 2021-present
- Label: YSL

Mauro Davi dos Santos Nepomuceno (born 1 March 2000), better known by his stage name Oruam (Brazilian Portuguese: [oɾuˈɐ̃]), is a Brazilian rapper, singer and songwriter.

== Career ==
Growing up in the favelas and suburbs of Rio de Janeiro during the mid-2010s, Oruam was immersed in the local soundscape dominated by baile funk and the emerging trap scene. Though not a performer at first, he described music as integral to his lifestyle, citing a formative experience attending a baile at age 14 or 15 and developing a lasting affinity for proibidão, a subgenre of funk that portrays life in Rio’s marginalized communities.

By 2021, Oruam began receiving studio invitations via social media, and in October of that year released his first track alongside Jhowzin, Raffé, and Chefin, contemporaries within Rio's growing trap scene. Their collaboration, "Invejoso" ("Jealous"), marked his debut studio recording and rapidly gained attention, amassing hundreds of millions of views on YouTube. Shortly afterward, he was contacted by Mainstreet, a prominent Rio-based label known for blending trap and baile funk, and signed with them following a performance in Cidade de Deus attended by label co-founder Orochi, in 2022. That year, Oruam won the "Revelação do Trap" award, which was held by Sobre Funk.

== Personal life ==
Raised in the Cidade de Deus favela, Oruam is the son of one of the leaders of Comando Vermelho, Marcinho VP who is in prison. He studied psychology at Estácio de Sá University, but did not graduate. In 2010, his mother, Márcia, served a prison sentence of less than one year.

Oruam's brother, Lucas assists in managing his affairs, while his sister, Débora, is a gospel singer with a substantial social media following.

Oruam was raised in an Evangelical household.

== Controversies ==
In March 2024, Oruam wore a shirt that read "freedom" with a photo of his father at his Lollapalooza show, which drew criticism on social media. On 23 January 2025, São Paulo city councilwoman Amanda Vettorazzo filed a bill that prohibits the city government from hiring or supporting events that promote crime and criminal organizations. The councilwoman has been receiving threats from Oruam's audience, which is why she filed a police report. Later, congressman Kim Kataguiri announced the proposal of a similar bill at the federal level, which was nicknamed "anti-Oruam".

== Legal issues ==
On 20 February 2025, Oruam was arrested on the Barra da Tijuca waterfront, in the West Zone of Rio de Janeiro, during a police checkpoint, after performing a wheelie in front of a Military Police car, and was taken to the 16th Civil Police Precinct in the neighborhood. He was charged with dangerous driving and released the same night after paying bail of 60 thousand reais. In addition, it was found that he was driving with a suspended National Driver's License.

The day after his arrest, speculation arose that Oruam had forced the situation as a marketing strategy. The newspaper O Globo reported that friends of the artist had recorded the action discreetly, and that the images could be included in a music video of unreleased songs. The controversy intensified after the singer announced the release of a new album: Liberdade, a few hours after being detained, on the 20th.

Six days later, Oruam was arrested again, this time for harboring fugitive drug trafficker Yuri Pereira Gonçalves in his mansion in the West Zone of Rio de Janeiro. During the search and seizure operation conducted by the Drug Enforcement Division (DRE) of the Civil Police, authorities found Yuri carrying a 9 mm pistol with a burst kit and ammunition. Oruam was released around 10:40 a.m. that same day, after signing a statement. He told reporters that his friend Yuri is not a drug trafficker and that the bullet used in a recent video was rubber.

== Discography ==
=== Studio albums ===
- Liberdade (2025)
