= Ruy Ohtake =

Brazilian architect (1938–2021)

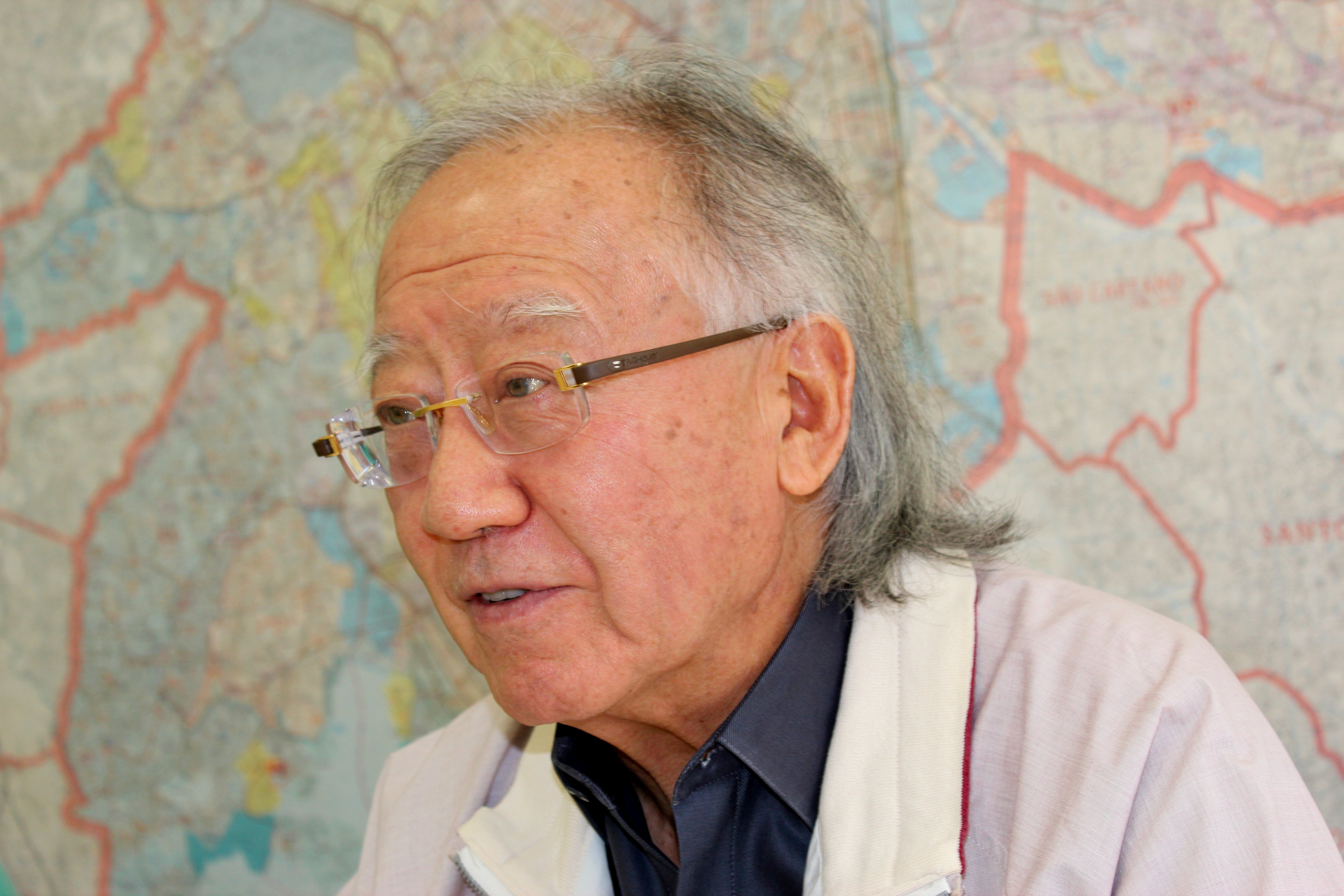
- Ruy Ohtake
- Born: 27 January 1938; São Paulo, Brazil
- Died: 27 November 2021 (aged 83); São Paulo, Brazil
- Occupation: Architect
- Buildings: Instituto Cultural Tomie Ohtake Hotel Unique Embassy of Brazil in Japan
- Projects: Brazilian Embassy in Tokyo; São Paulo Pavilion at the Expo '90

Ruy Ohtake (27 January 1938 — 27 November 2021) was a Brazilian architect and professor. He was the son of artist Tomie Ohtake.

== History ==
Son of Japanese artist Tomie Ohtake, Ruy Ohtake was known for his unusual architectural designs. Examples of his projects are the half-moon-shaped Hotel Unique, the Hotel Renaissance building, and commercial building Edifício Santa Catarina at Avenida Paulista - all three located in the city of São Paulo. Ohtake is also famous for the design of the Tomie Ohtake Cultural Institute and the commercial building next to it. He has also designed the Embassy of Brazil in Japan, located in Minato Ward, Tokyo.

He majored in Architecture in 1960 at the University of São Paulo and taught at the Mackenzie Presbyterian University.

== Personal life ==
Ohtake was married twice: first to Brazilian actress Célia Helena, who died in 1997, and later to architect Silvia Vaz. He had two children, Elisa and Rodrigo.

Ohtake died on 27 November 2021, in São Paulo at the age of 83.

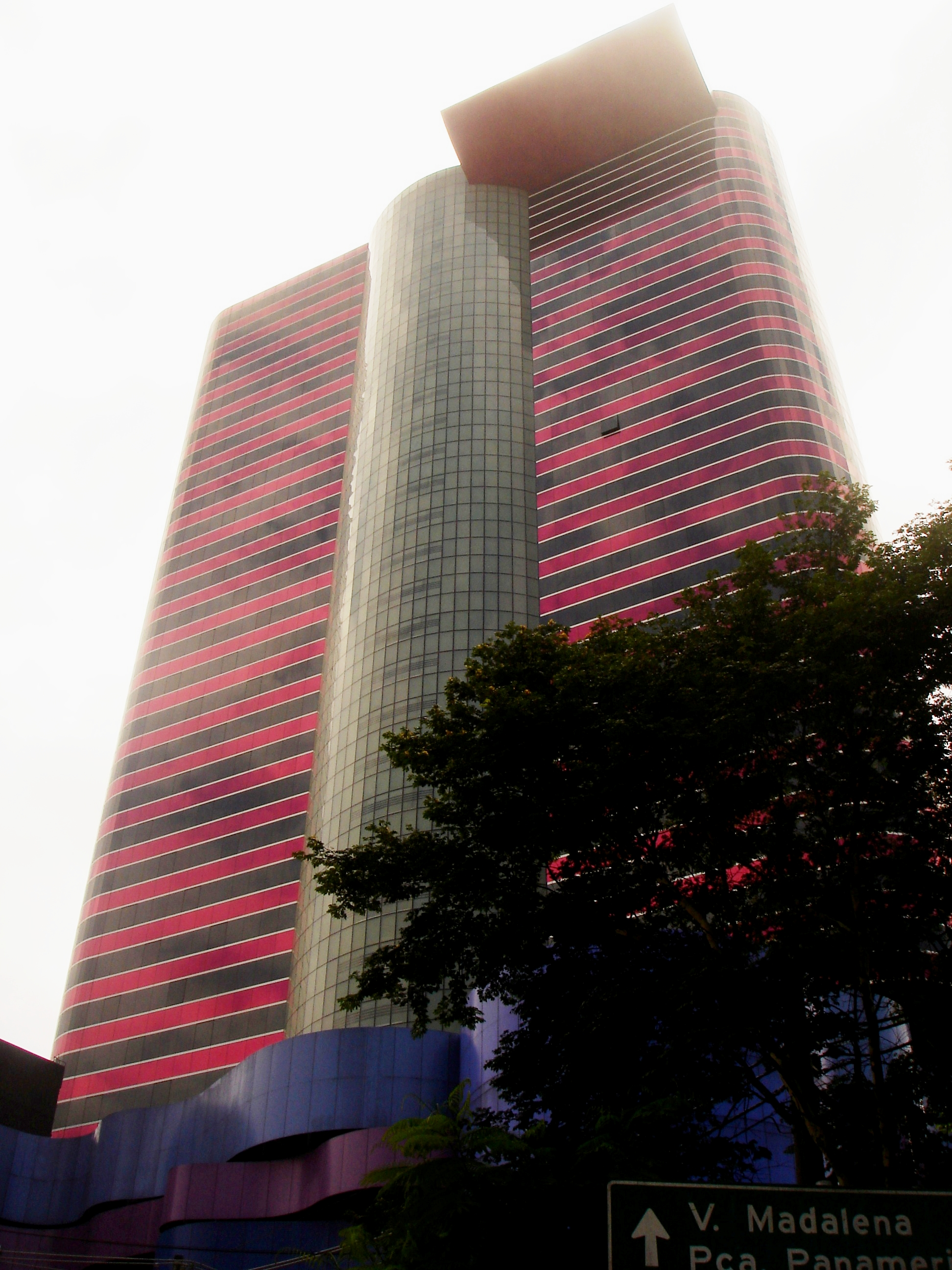
Instituto Cultural Tomie Ohtake (Ohtake Cultural)

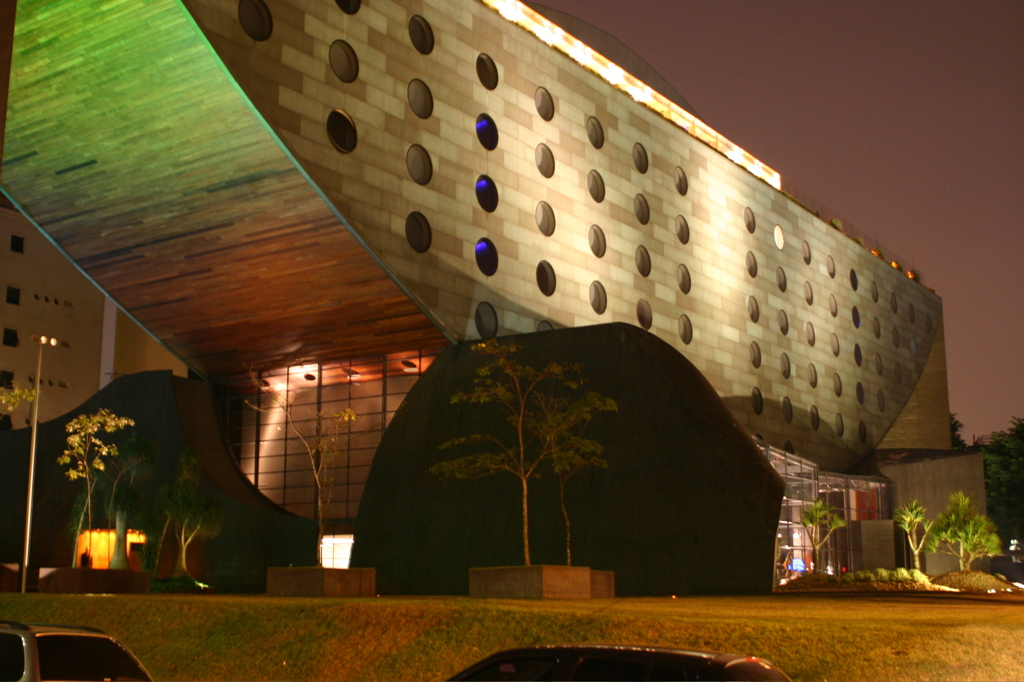
Hotel Unique (pt), São Paulo

== See also ==
- Japanese community of São Paulo
