= São Paulo Shimbun =

Japanese-language Brazilian newspaper (1946-2019)

- Type: Newspaper
- Founded: October 8, 1946
- Ceased publication: January 1, 2019
- Language: Japanese
- City: São Paulo, Brazil

The São Paulo Shimbun (サンパウロ新聞 Sanpauro Shinbun) was a Japanese-language newspaper established in 1946 and published in São Paulo, Brazil. It was one of two Japanese-language newspapers in the city. On January 1, 2019, the newspaper printed its last edition, with no specific plans to continue its operations online.

== History ==
Founded on October 8, 1946, the Journal São Paulo Shimbun was a vehicle of communication directed towards the Japanese-Brazilian community. Businessman Mituto Mizumoto observed the need that Japanese immigrants had for their own newspaper which would publish facts about Brazil and Japan. The São Paulo Shimbun was authorized to start publishing on September 6, 1946. On October 12 of the same year the first edition was published. As of 2013 Kátia Sattomura was the chief editor of the newspaper's Portuguese-language division. The newspaper publishes Portuguese content over the internet. It printed its last issue on January 1, 2019.

== Homage ==
In 2011, Scottish musician Momus discovered a copy of the newspaper at the Center for Overseas Migration and Cultural Interaction in Kobe, Japan and wrote "I want someone to make a typeface based on that masthead so I can use it for a future album cover." In 2013, James Goggin created a typeface based on the masthead typography from the newspaper for Momus's album Bambi.

== See also ==
- Japanese Brazilian
- Japanese community of São Paulo
- Nikkey Shimbun
