= Tomie Ohtake =

Japanese-Brazilian artist

- 大竹富江
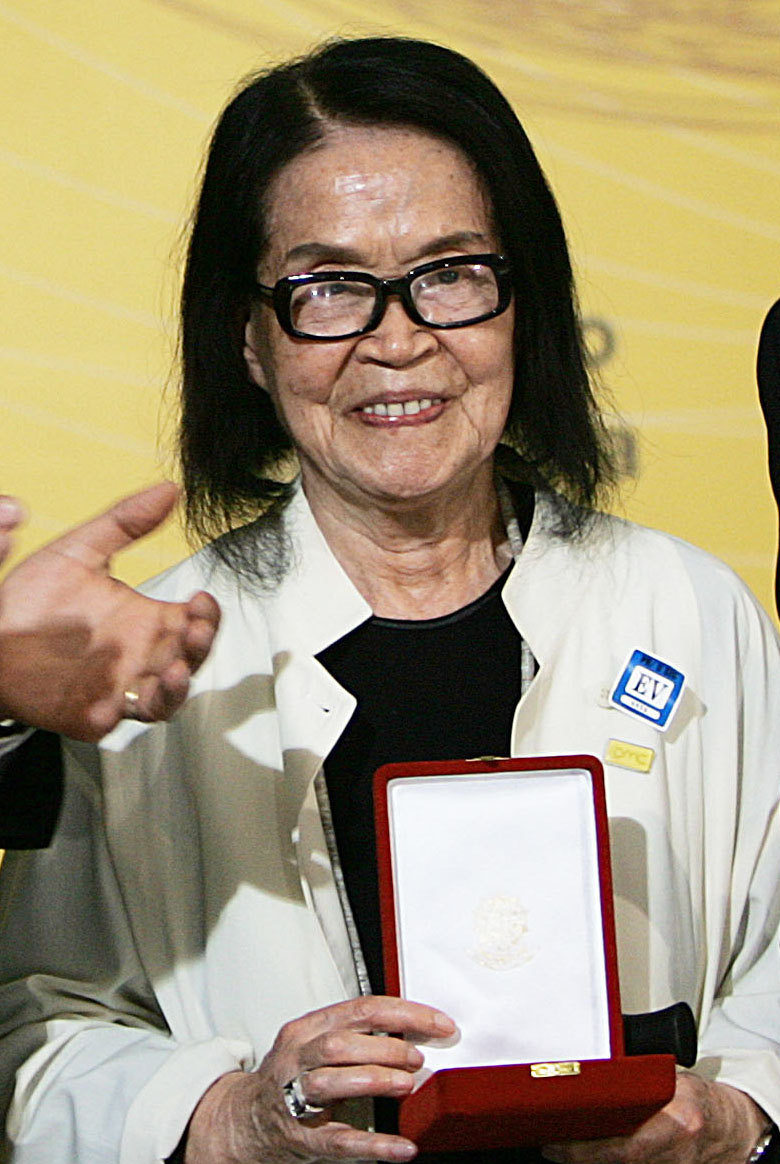
- Ohtake receiving the Order of Cultural Merit in 2006
- Born: Tomie Nakakubo; 21 November 1913; Kyoto, Empire of Japan
- Died: 12 February 2015 (aged 101); São Paulo, Brazil
- Citizenship: Japan (until 1968); Brazil (from 1968)
- Education: Keisuke Sugano (菅野圭介)
- Known for: Painting, drawing, printing, sculpture
- Style: Geometric abstraction, lyrical abstraction
- Movement: Abstract art
- Spouse: Ushio Ohtake (m. 1936, sep.)
- Children: 2 (including Ruy)
- Memorial(s): Tomie Ohtake Institute

Japanese name
- Kanji: 大竹富江
- Hiragana: おおたけ とみえ
Transcriptions
- Romanization: Ōtake Tomie
- Kunrei-shiki: Ôtake Tomie
- Nihon-shiki: Ôtake Tomie

Tomie Ohtake (大竹富江, Ōtake Tomie; née Nakakubo (中久保); 21 November 1913 – 12 February 2015) was a Japanese Brazilian visual artist. Her work includes paintings, prints and sculptures. She was one of the main representatives of informal abstractionism in Brazil.

== Biography ==
Ohtake was born in 1913 in Kyoto. In 1936, when she was twenty-three years old, Ohtake traveled to Brazil to visit a brother but could not return to Japan due to the Pacific Theater of World War II occurring there. Ohtake therefore settled in São Paulo where she married the agronomist Ushio Ohtake, later giving birth to her son Rui, an architect, and Ricardo, former secretary of culture for the state of São Paulo. After many years of taking care of her family and household, at the age of 39 Ohtake attended an exhibition of the artist Keya Sugano at the São Paulo Museum of Modern Art and soon began producing genre and landscape paintings under his tutelage.

Early on in her career, Ohtake moved to figurative painting and became a key figure in the Brazilian geometric abstraction movement. Known for her exploration of primary colours and geometric frames, she had her first exhibition in 1957 in the São Paulo Museum of Modern Art, and in 1961 she participated in the São Paulo Biennale. It was at this time that she started her series of "blind paintings," a series of works for which Ohtake blindfolded herself in reaction to the spread of extreme rationalism in contemporary Brazilian art. Describing her work as emanating from both Western and Japanese traditions, Ohtake mentions Japanese verse and spiritual thought as providing key inspirations for her works: "Haiku poems convey a view of the world in seventeen syllables. My painting also attempts to synthesize forms, reducing images to their essential minimum, and is therefore universal." Later expanding her oeuvre to printmaking and sculpture, in 1972 she participated in the Prints section of the Venice Biennale as part of the Seibi Group, a Japanese artists' association, and in 1978 exhibited at the Tokyo Biennale.

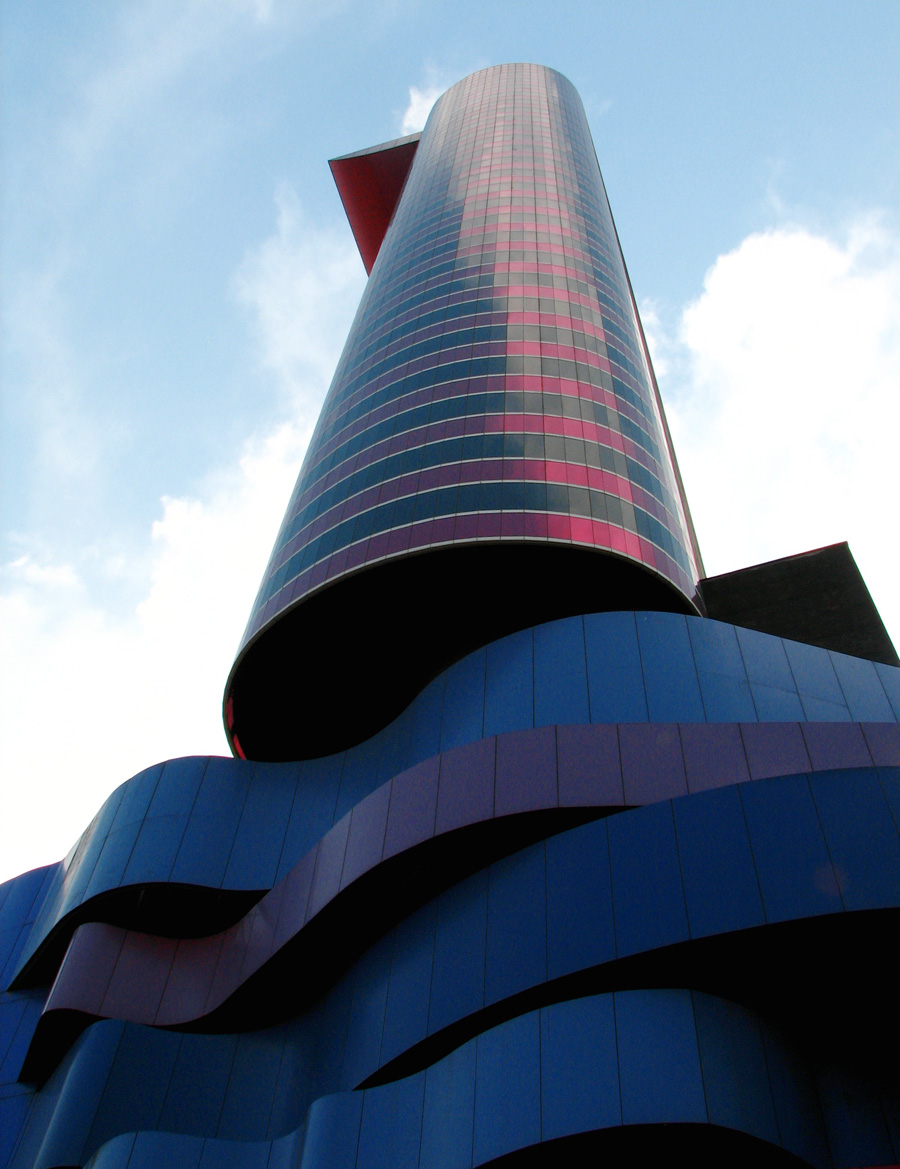
The Instituto Tomie Ohtake building in São Paulo

Today, her public and private works are to be found across the city of São Paulo: From large mosaics on the platform walls of the São Paulo Metro's Consolação stop to a wave-shaped, ribbon-like monument honouring the history of Japanese immigration to Brazil beside the Centro Cultural São Paulo, her works are ubiquitous within the city's visual scene. In 1988, Ohtake was awarded the Order of Rio Branco for the public sculpture commemorating the 80th anniversary of Japanese immigration in São Paulo and in 2006 she was awarded the Order of Cultural Merit. The Instituto Tomie Ohtake was opened in 2001 in São Paulo as a non-profit museum showcasing the artist's works as well as local and international exhibitions celebrating contemporary architecture and visual culture. Designed by her son and architect Ruy Ohtake, other events surrounding art education, cinema, theatre and literature have since been added to the organisation' s public programme.

Towards the end of her life in 2013, Ohtake began a series of monochrome paintings which she worked on until the end of her life. Comprising the same attention to geometric forms and shadow, these works utilised impasto and texture to emphasise line rather than the shifts in colour which characterised her work in the 1970s.

Tomie Ohtake died on 12 February 2015 at the age of 101 in the Hospital Sírio-Libanês in São Paulo, suffering from pneumonia. She was later cremated.

Ohtake's work is in the collection of the Metropolitan Museum of Art, the San Francisco Museum of Modern Art, and the Tate.

== Legacy ==
In 2023 her work was included in the exhibition Action, Gesture, Paint: Women Artists and Global Abstraction 1940-1970 at the Whitechapel Gallery in London.

== Gallery ==
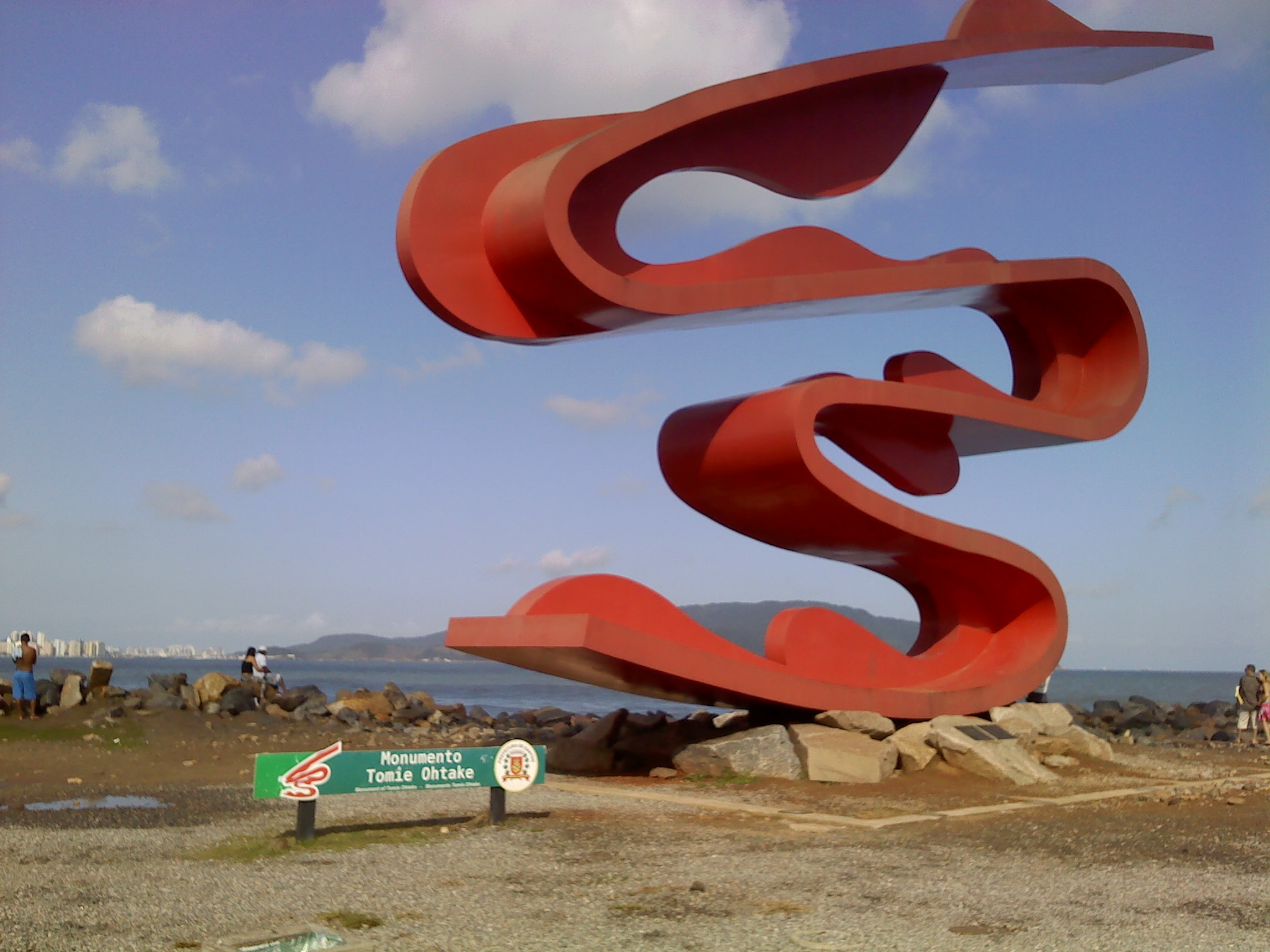
Monumento Tomie Ohtake in Santos (2008)

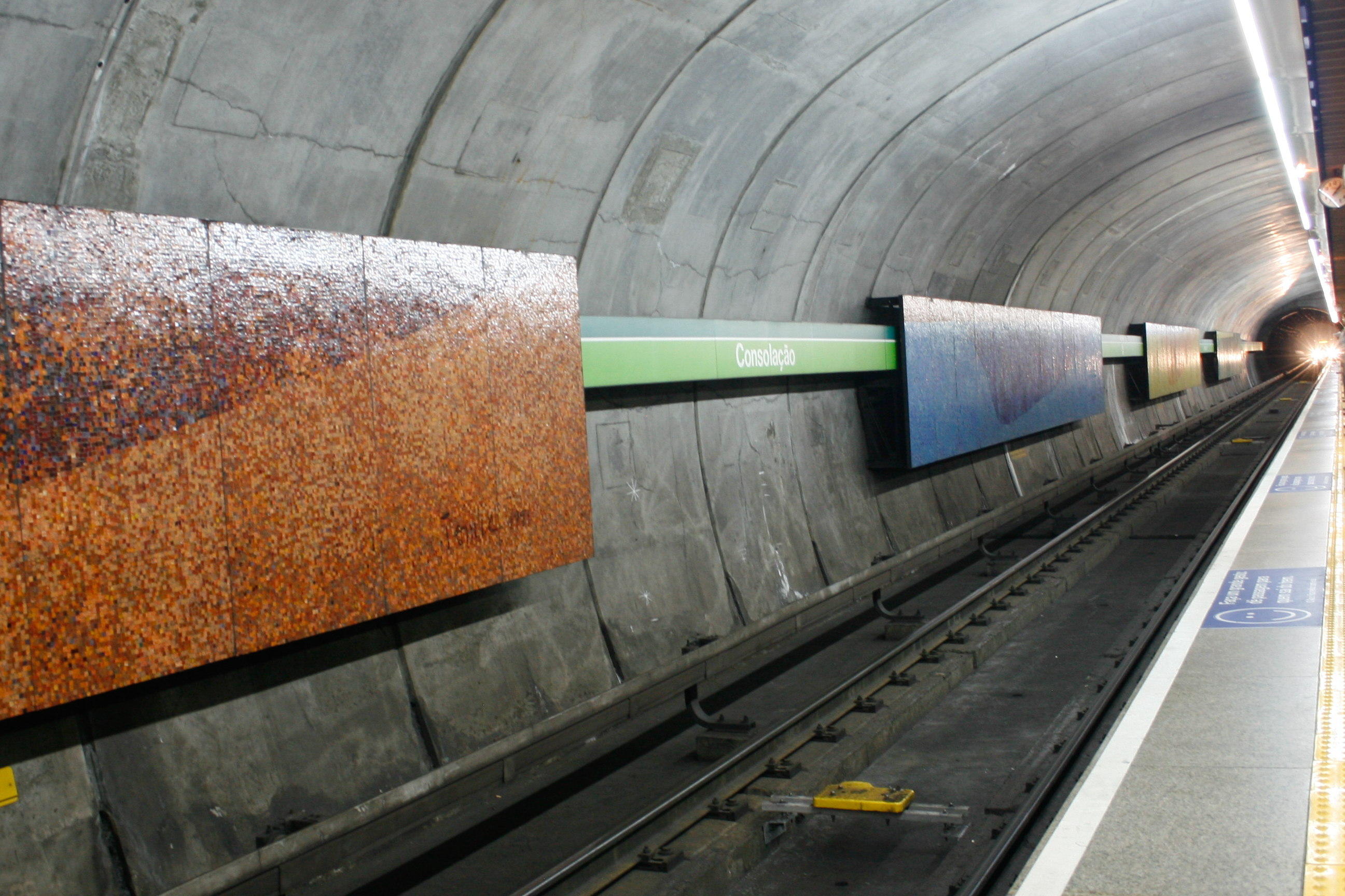
Quatro Estações mosaic mural in the São Paulo Metro

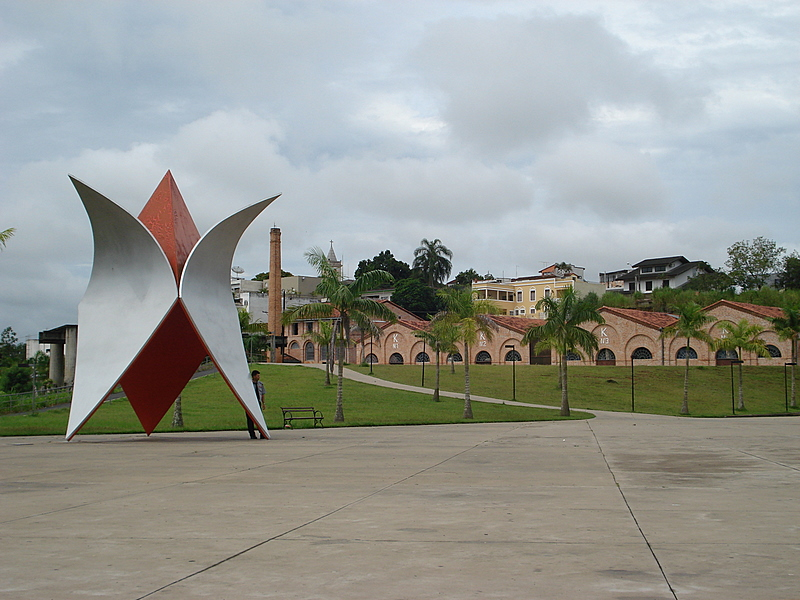
Monumento Guaracuí (2002)

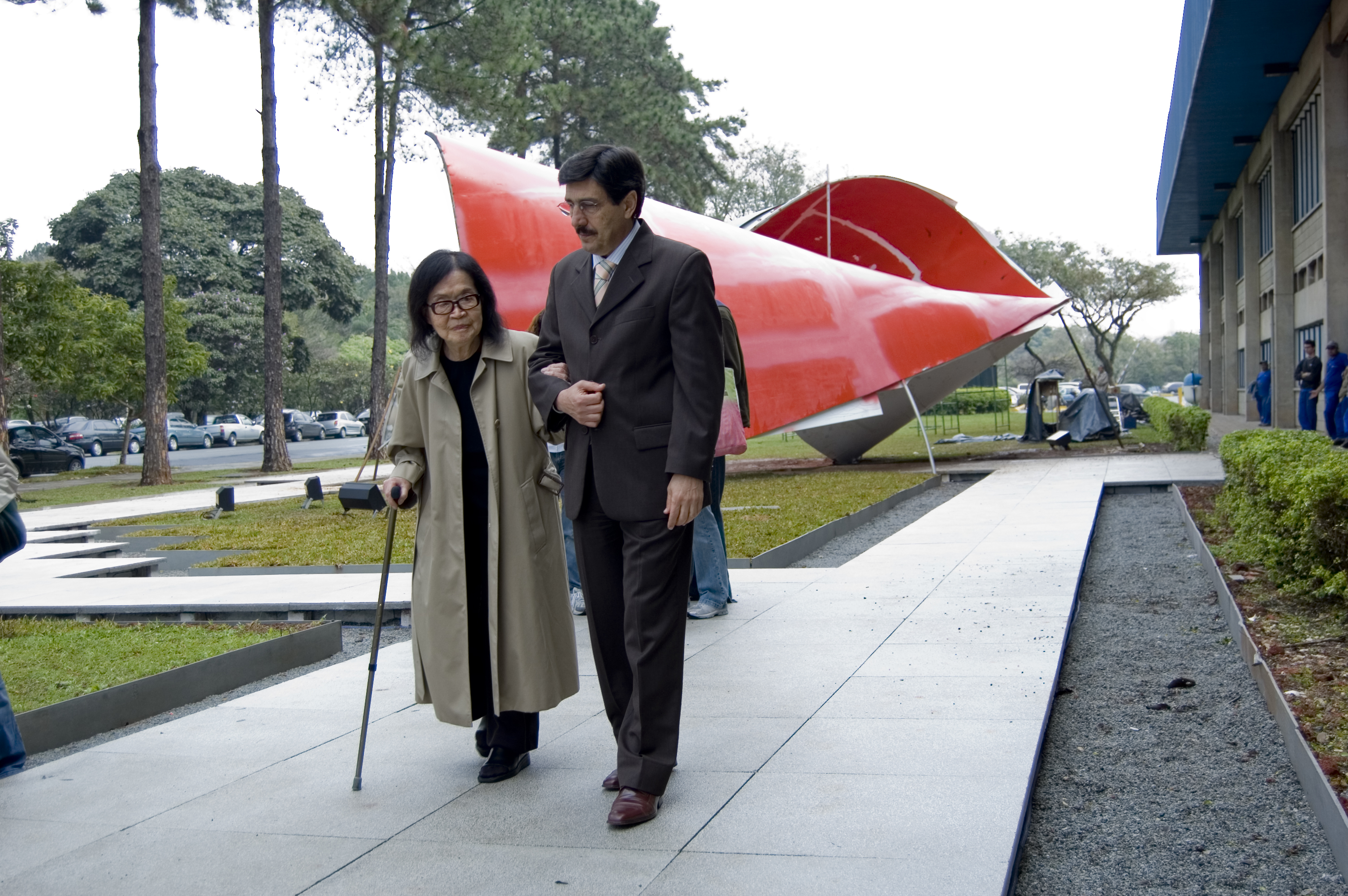
Sem Título (2008), Universidade de São Paulo

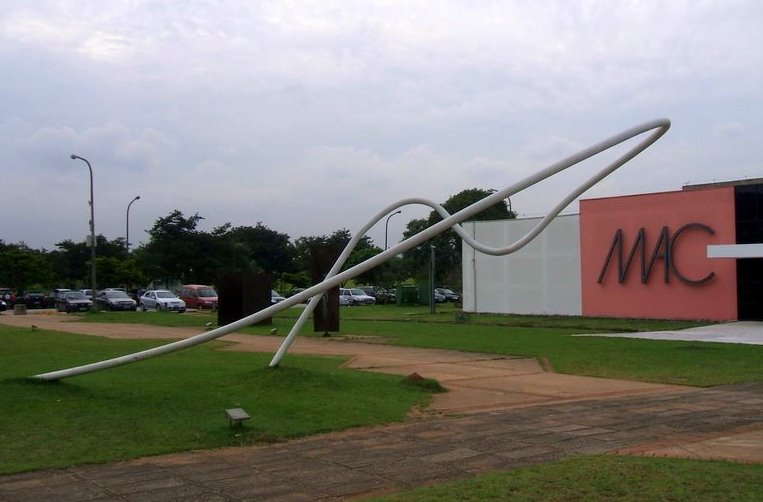
Tomie Ohtake's masterpiece, in front of [MAC-USP].

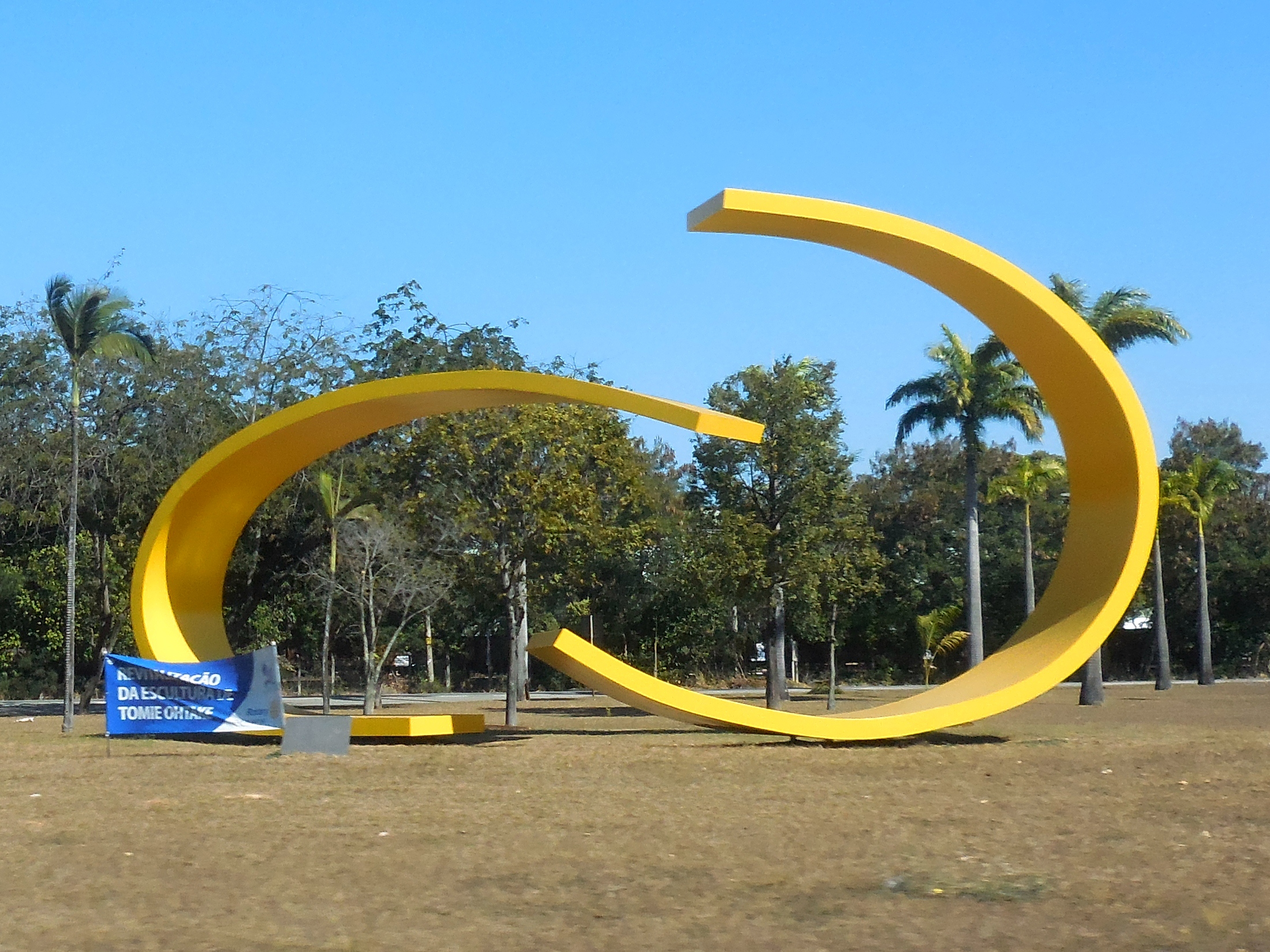
Tomie Ohtake Monument (2004) in Ipatinga, Minas Gerais.

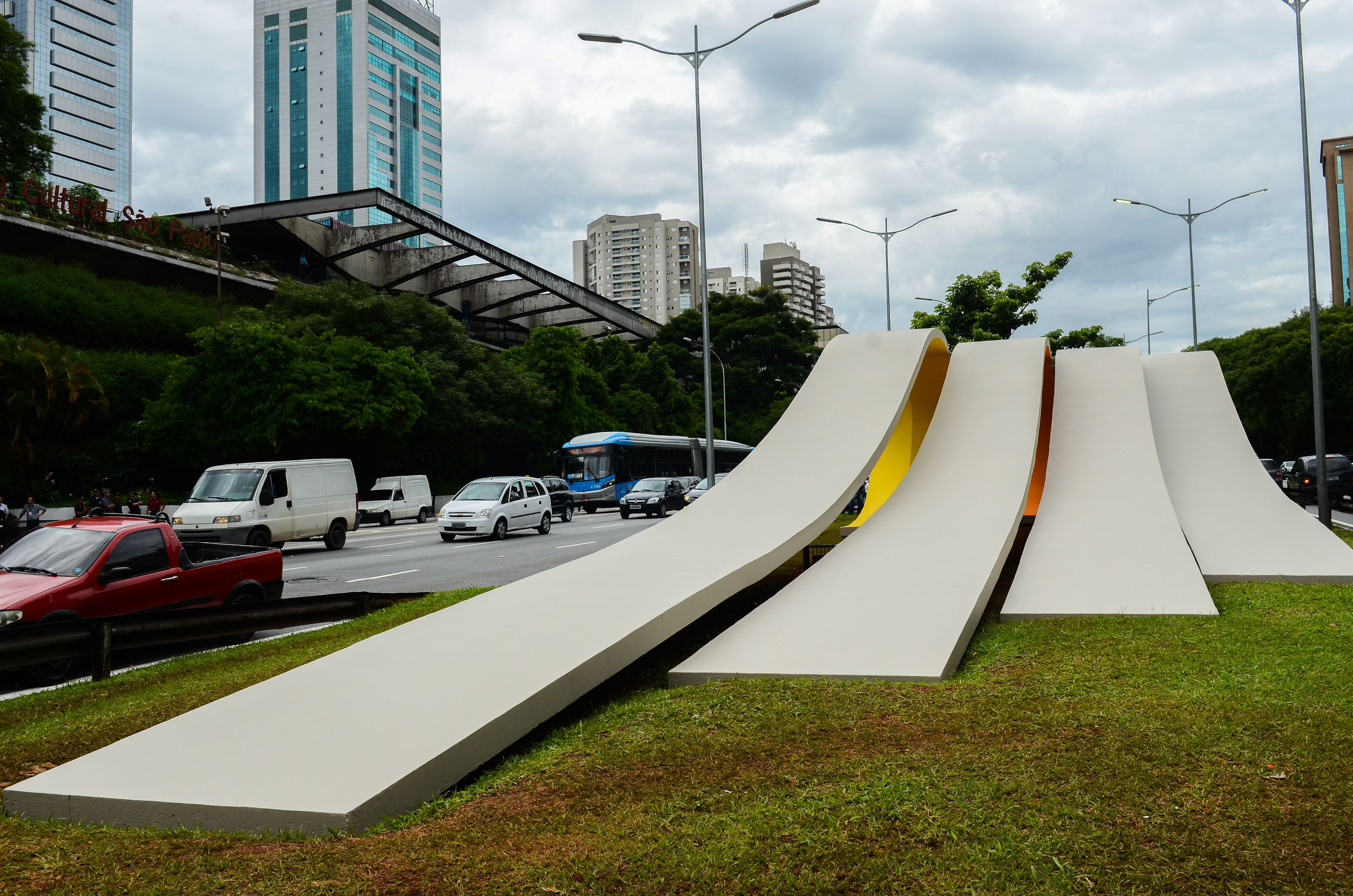
Monument in honor of 80th anniversary of Japanese Immigration (2017) on 23 May Avenue, in São Paulo.

== See also ==
- List of centenarians (artists)
