= Liberdade (district of São Paulo) =

District of São Paulo, Brazil

Coordinates: 23°34′04″S 46°37′46″W

Liberdade リベルダージ
- Neighborhood of São Paulo
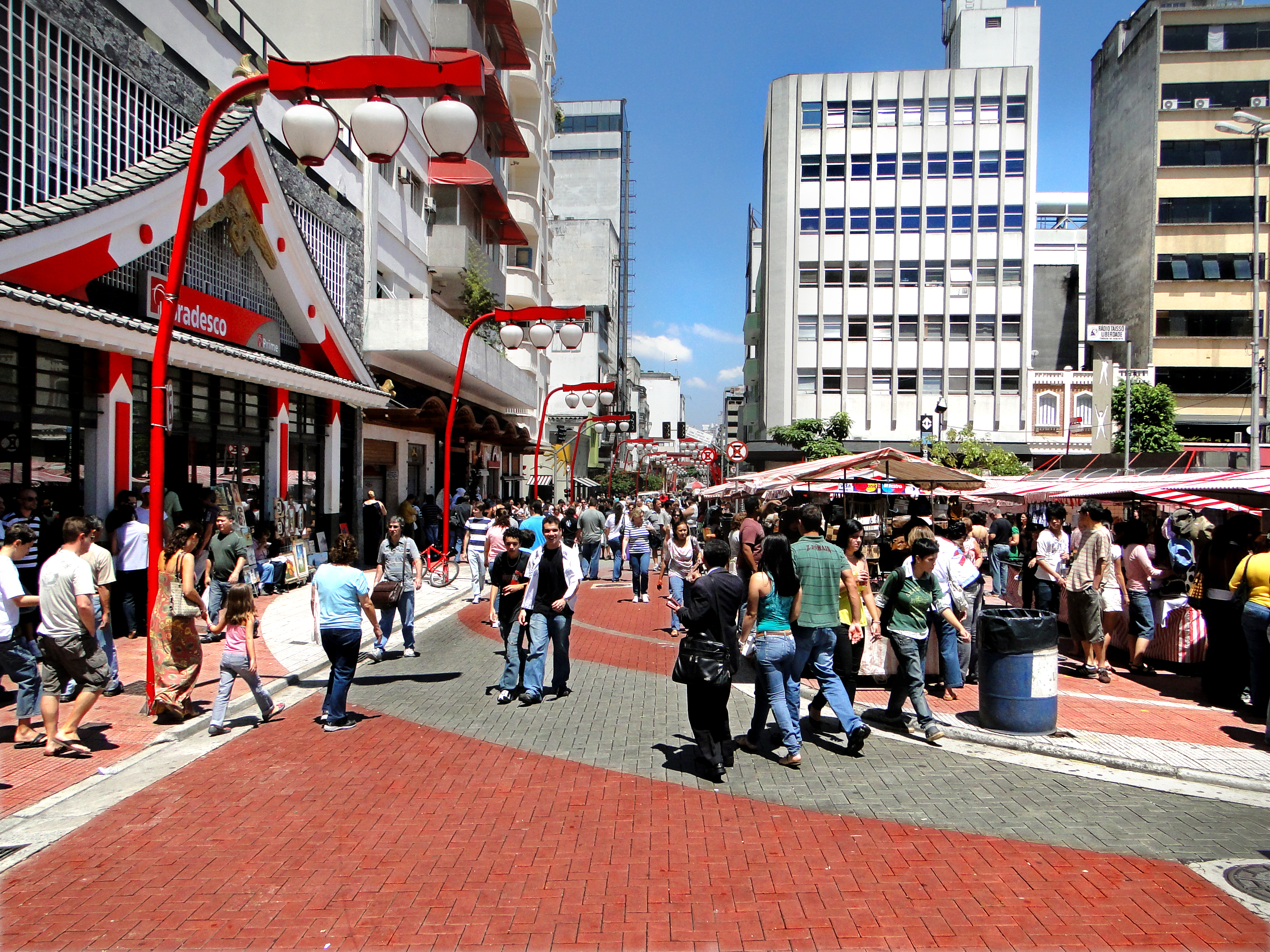
- Interactive map of Liberdade リベルダージ
- Country: Brazil
- State: São Paulo
- City: São Paulo
- Subprefecture: Sé

Government
  - Type: Subprefecture

Area
  - Total: 3.7 km^{2} (1.4 sq mi)

Population (2014)
  - Total: 218,310
  - Density: 16,723/km^{2} (43,310/sq mi)

Liberdade (Portuguese: [libeʁˈdadʒi], liberty; Japanese: リベルダージ, romanized: Riberudāji) is a district in the subprefecture of Sé, in São Paulo, Brazil. Liberdade is known as a Japantown, although the Japanese presence did not occur throughout the neighborhood, but in specific streets. Japanese immigrants started settling in the region in 1912, coming from the interior of São Paulo, as many did not adapt to working on coffee farms and started looking for better opportunities in the capital. Even today, the neighborhood is famous for its typically Japanese restaurants and shops, as well as its oriental elites and signs in Japanese.

Currently, the majority of Japanese people and their descendants no longer live in the neighborhood, only maintaining their commercial establishments in the region. With the departure of the Japanese, the region began to receive many Chinese and Korean immigrants.

== History ==
Liberdade was previously known as "Campo da Forca" (Field of the Gallows) until the late 19th century, and was an area reserved for the execution of slaves and convicts. Death was considered the only path to liberty (liberdade) for slaves. The condemned were led to the Igreja Nossa Senhora da Boa Morte (Church of Our Lady of Good Death) to perform a final prayer for a rapid and painless death. Slaves and convicts were executed in the Largo da Forca (Gallows Square), the public square now known as Praça da Liberdade. Cemitério dos Aflitos (Cemetery of the Afflicted) was created in 1774 to bury executed slaves, people who had committed suicide, and others who could not be interred elsewhere.

The cemetery was replaced by housing development in the 20th century, and the simple Capela dos Aflitos on Rua dos Estudantes is a remnant of the era. Igreja da Santa Cruz das Almas dos Enforcados (Church of Santa Cruz of the Souls of the Hanged), prominently located to the south of the public square, commemorates the dead of Campo da Forca. Executions were carried out in Campo da Forca until 1891, and the square was renamed Liberdade.

The Japanese presence in the neighborhood began in 1912. One of the reasons for this was that almost every property in the region had a basement, making rent incredibly cheap by housing multiple families, albeit at a poor quality. Due to its location, workers could get around easily and support the nascent Nipo-Brazilian community (known as Nikkeis). Their presence would be accompanied by the Chinese, Taiwanese, Korean and Okinawan immigrants to Brazil in the upcoming decades.

By the early 20th century, commercial activities began to emerge to service this immigrant population: hostels, markets with imported goods, a house that made tofu, another that made manjū (a Japanese confection), and also job-creating firms, Liberdade gained the label of "the Japanese street". In 1915, the Taisho Shogakko (Taisho Primary School) was founded to educate the children of the Japanese immigrants, then approximately 300 people. In 1932, there were about 2,000 Japanese people in the city of São Paulo. They came directly from Japan and also from the interior of São Paulo, after concluding their work contracts on plantations, in search of a work opportunity in the booming city.

1946 saw the founding of the São Paulo Shimbun newspaper, the first postwar periodical among the Nikkei, as well as the inauguration of the still operating Sol Bookstore (Taiyodo), where Japanese books can be found.

In March 1947, an orchestra formed by Professor Masahiko Maruyama performed the first post-war concert, in the Auditorium of the Paulista Teacher's Center on Avenida Liberdade.

In 1953, Yoshikazu Tanaka inaugurated a 5-story building on Rua Galvão Bueno, with a hall, restaurant, hotel and a large projection room on the ground floor with room for an audience of 1,500 named Cine Niterói, which grew to rival other Japanese-operated theaters in the region. In April 1964, the Japanese Cultural Association of São Paulo (Bunkyô) building was inaugurated.

In the 1970s, the subway station of Liberdade was constructed as part Line 1, the first São Paulo Metro line, altering the urban composition of the region.

== Overview ==
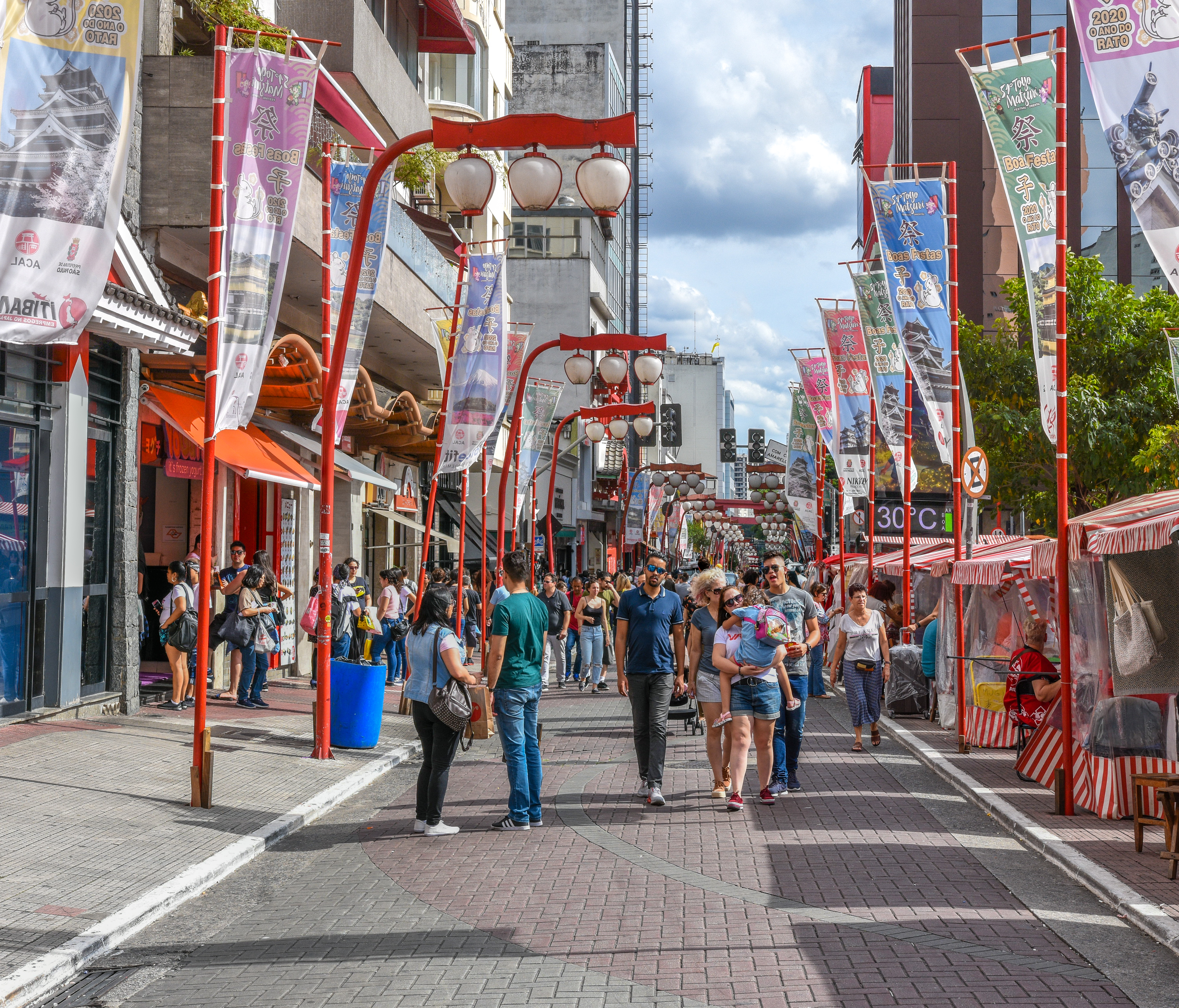
Liberdade in 2019

Popularly known as a district for Nipo-Brazilians and Japanese culture in Brazil, Liberdade currently houses significant populations of Chinese, Taiwanese and Koreans also live in the district of Liberdade.

Since 1974, the entrance to Liberdade has been marked by a nine-meter tall red torii. This towering structure, situated on Rua Galvão Bueno, is a distinctive representation of the neighborhood. Liberdade was successfully connected to the São Paulo subway network in the 1970s, opening the area up to commerce. Today, thousands of tourist from inside and outside the city flock to the public square in Liberdade every weekend to purchase craft goods at the local weekly fair.

In January 2008, in order to celebrate 100 years of Japanese immigration to Brazil, a project to revitalize the quarter was approved by the mayor Gilberto Kassab. 40% of the restoration was for the visit of Crown Prince Naruhito to São Paulo in June 2008.

Liberdade is a meeting spot for many subgroups, especially among young people who are interested in Japanese culture.

== Media ==
The now defunct Japanese newspaper São Paulo Shimbun was published in Liberdade.

The Japanese newspaper Nikkey Shimbun and its sister Portuguese paper the Jornal Nippak were published in Liberdade.

== Culture and recreation ==
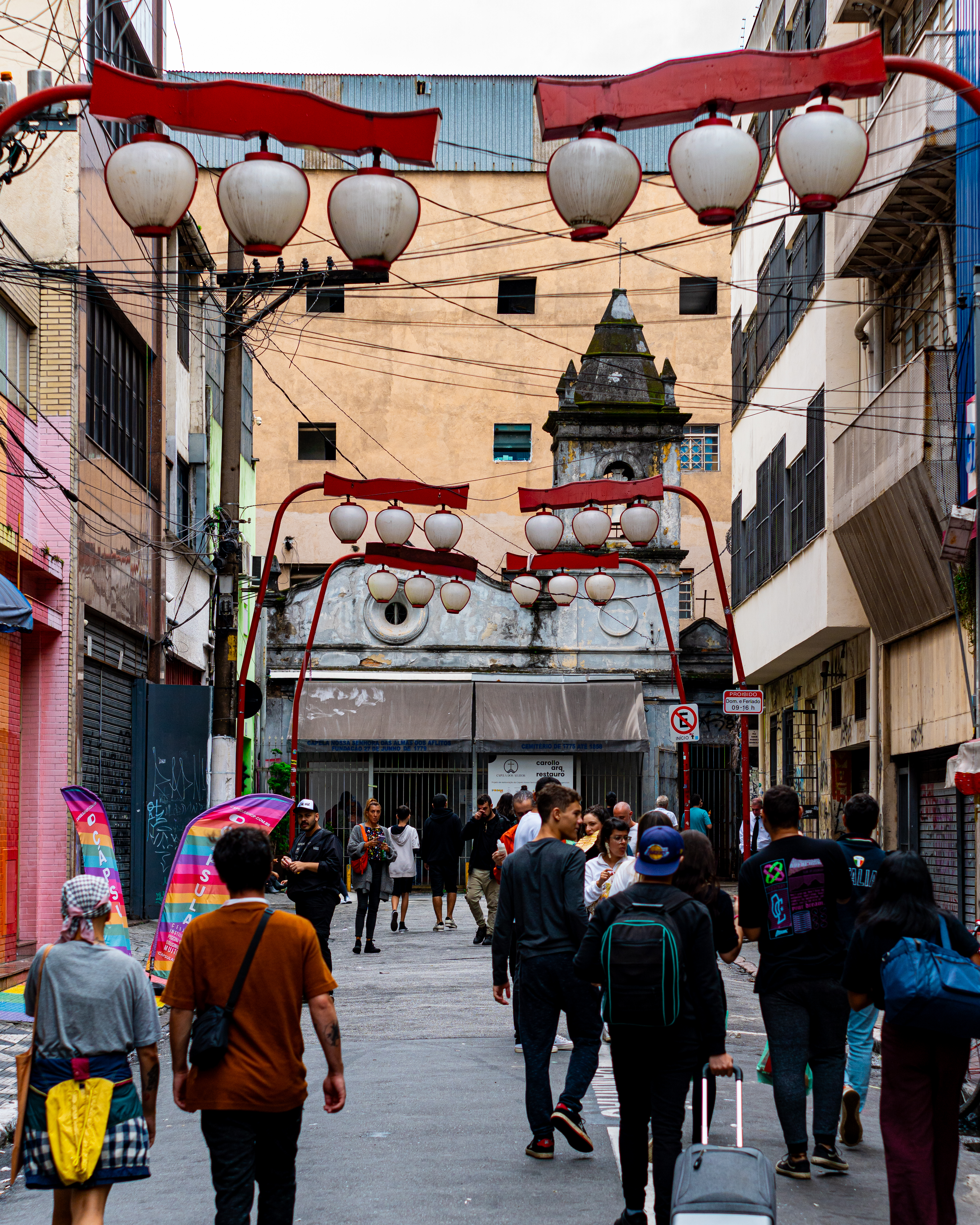
Rua dos Aflitos (Aflitos Street), where Capela dos Aflitos is located

The district is home to several churches, such as "Igreja Santa Cruz das Almas dos Enforcados", "Capela Nossa Senhora dos Aflitos", the Maronite "Nossa Senhora do Líbano", and several evangelical churches.

The Historical Museum of Japanese Immigration in Brazil (Portuguese: Museu Histórico da Imigração Japonesa no Brasil) (ブラジル日本移民史料館) is located in Liberdade.

== Access ==
Liberdade is served by the São Paulo Metro (Japão-Liberdade Station), a station on Line 1 (Blue). The station opened in 1975 and receives 21,000 passengers per day. Access to the station is via Praça da Liberdade.

== See also ==
- Japanese community of São Paulo
