= Nikkey Shimbun =

Brazilian newspaper

- Type: Daily newspaper
- Founded: 1998
- Ceased publication: December 18, 2021
- Language: Japanese
- City: Liberdade, São Paulo, Brazil
- Circulation: 10,000 (as of 2013)

The Nikkey Shimbun (ニッケイ新聞, Nikkei Shinbun) or the Jornal do Nikkey was a Japanese language newspaper published in Liberdade, São Paulo, Brazil. It was one of two Japanese newspapers published in that city, the other being the São Paulo Shimbun. On December 18, 2021, the newspaper printed its last edition.

The newspaper distributed the Prêmio Paulista de Esporte along with the Jornal Nikkei.

Before its discontinuation, the newspaper's president was Raul Takaki (高木 ラウル, Takaki Rauru) and the editor-in-chief was Masayuki Fukuzawa.

== History ==
The newspaper was founded in 1998 as a merger between the Diário Nippak and the Jornal Paulista. The former, headed by Toshihiko "Kan-chan" Nakabayashi (died in 1992 at 77 years of age), was founded in 1949 and the latter was founded in 1947.

The Nikkey Shimbun stated in 2013, that it has a daily run of 10,000 copies.

Due to a decline in readership, the newspaper ceased publication in December 2021. Six of its Japanese-language reporters, including editor Masayuki Fukuzawa, joined the Diário Brasil Nippou, a news website established in January 2022 to serve the Brazilian Nikkei community. The website has faced financial challenges and has turned to donations and the printing of special editions to survive.

== Jornal Nippak ==
Due to the aging of the immigrant Japanese community, the newspaper launched a weekly Portuguese edition, the Jornal Nippak, initially to reach children of Japanese immigrants. As of 2013 the chief editor is Aldo Shiguti. By the time the Jornal Nippak had been launched, there was already a Portuguese website. Raul Takaki stated that even though the Portuguese website existed, and that the other Japanese newspaper in the city also had one, the Nikkey Shimbun felt a need to make a Nissei-oriented daughter publication. Shiguti stated that Brazilians interested in Japanese culture have also bought copies of the Portuguese edition.

== See also ==
- Japanese Brazilian
- Japanese community of São Paulo
