= Liberdade (album) =

Studio album by Oruam
- Released: February 20, 2025
- Genre: Funk carioca, trap
- Length: Mainstreet Records

Liberdade (Freedom) is the first album by Brazilian rapper Oruam, released on February 20, 2025.

== Context and design of the album ==
On January 27, 2025, Congressman Kim Kataguiri announced the introduction of a bill to prohibit public funding for concerts by artists who promote organized crime. The project became popularly known as the “anti-Oruam law.”

On February 20, 2025, Oruam was arrested on the Barra da Tijuca waterfront, in the West Zone of Rio de Janeiro during a police checkpoint, after realizing a bootleg turn in front of a Military Police car, being taken to the 16th Civil Police Station in the neighborhood. He was charged with reckless driving and released that same night after paying bail of 60,000 reais. The day after his arrest, speculation arose that the singer had staged the incident as a marketing strategy. The newspaper O Globo reported that friends of the artist had discreetly recorded the incident, and that the footage could be included in a music video for unreleased songs. The controversy intensified after the singer announced the release of a new album, Liberdade, a few hours after being detained on the 20th.

The album cover features a black-and-white photograph of Oruam and eight family members, all wearing T-shirts with the face of dealer Marcinho VP and the word “liberdade (freedom)". The back cover shows Oruam and a child, both wearing T-shirts identical to those on the front cover.

== Reception ==
Professional ratings
Review scores
Source	Rating
G1	4.5/5 stars
Folha de S.Paulo	3/5 stars

After being arrested for dangerous driving, Oruam established himself as Brazil's most listened to musician on streaming platforms, with over 7 million plays in four days. Three days after their release, the music videos for “22 Meu Vulgo,” “Lei Anti O.R.U.A.M.,” and “Madrugada é Solidão” were the most viewed on YouTube in their category. Journalist Jairo Malta gave the album a score of 3 out of 5, stating that his numbers on streaming platforms, his arrest hours before the album's release, and his pleas for freedom to his father give Oruam a Hollywood narrative to keep him in the spotlight.

For G1, Mauro Ferreira referred to Liberdade as the manifesto of an artist who exposes the perspective of someone who was raised in the favela, with his testimonies as a rapper who denies being a criminal while worshipping the image of his father, Marcinho VP, as a hero.

== Track listing ==
No.	Title	Length
1.	"22 Meu Vulgo"	3:39
2.	"Madrugada é Solidão (part. MC Poze do Rodo)"	4:10
3.	"Avançando Muito"	4:11
4.	"Lei Anti O.R.U.A.M"	2:38
5.	"Audi Blue (part. Vinicin)"	3:01
6.	"Vazio (part. Orochi)"	2:17
7.	"Não Mente Pra Mentiroso (part. MC Cabelinho)"	3:36
8.	"Desce do Salto (part. Didì)"	2:37
9.	"Saudade dos Manin"	2:26
10.	"Complexo do Lins (part. MC Safira)"	2:21
11.	"Mente de Um Astro"	3:15
12.	"Ela Quer Dar (part. Borges, Leviano, Chefin)"	4:18
13.	"AK de Bipé (part. Chefin, MC Ryan SP, MC Cabelinho)"	3:45
14.	"Jogador Caro"	2:49
15.	"Eu Não Tenho Casa"	2:30
