= Japão-Liberdade (São Paulo Metro) =

São Paulo Metro station

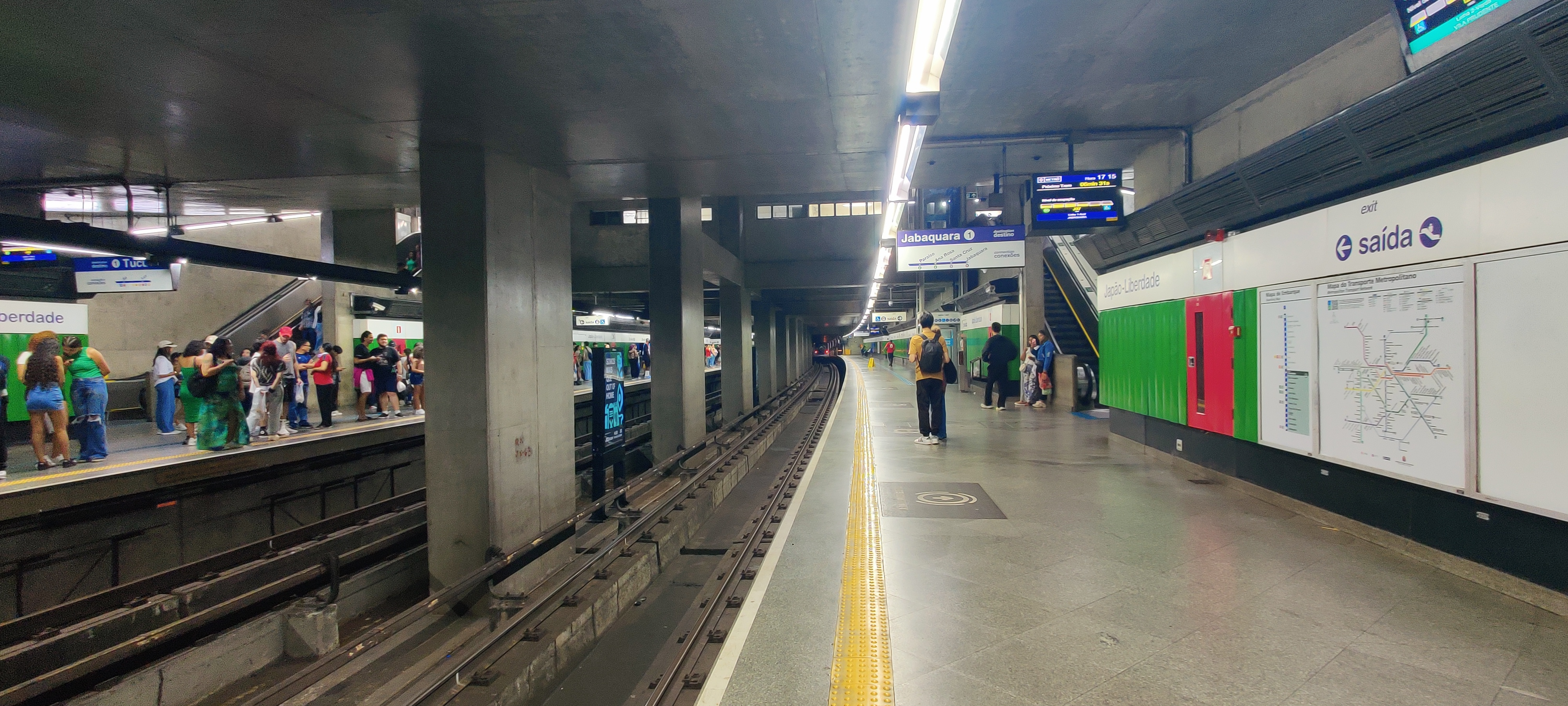
- station platform

General information
- Location: São Paulo; Brazil
- Coordinates: 23°33′17″S 46°38′08″W
- Owner: Government of the State of São Paulo
- Operator: Companhia do Metropolitano de São Paulo
- Platforms: Side platforms

Construction
- Structure type: Underground
- Accessible: Yes

Other information
- Station code: LIB

History
- Opened: February 17, 1975
- Former names: Liberdade

Passengers
- 21,000/business day

Services
Preceding station	São Paulo Metro	Following station
Sé towards Tucuruvi	Line 1	São Joaquim towards Jabaquara
Track layout
Location

Japão-Liberdade (Portuguese: Estação Japão-Liberdade) is a station on Line 1 (Blue) of the São Paulo Metro, serving the Japão section of the Liberdade district. The station opened in 1975 and receives 21,000 passengers per day. Access to the station is via Praça da Liberdade, the center of the historically Japanese-Brazilian neighborhood.
