= Cherry blossom cultivation by country =

In the present day, ornamental cherry blossom trees are distributed and cultivated worldwide. While flowering cherry trees were historically present in Europe, North America, and China, the practice of cultivating ornamental cherry trees was centered in Japan, and many of the cultivars planted worldwide, such as that of Prunus × yedoensis, have been developed from Japanese hybrids.

The global distribution of ornamental cherry trees, along with flower viewing festivals or hanami, largely started in the early 20th century, often as gifts from Japan. However, some regions have their own native species of flowering cherry trees, a notable variety of which is Prunus cerasoides.

== Australia ==
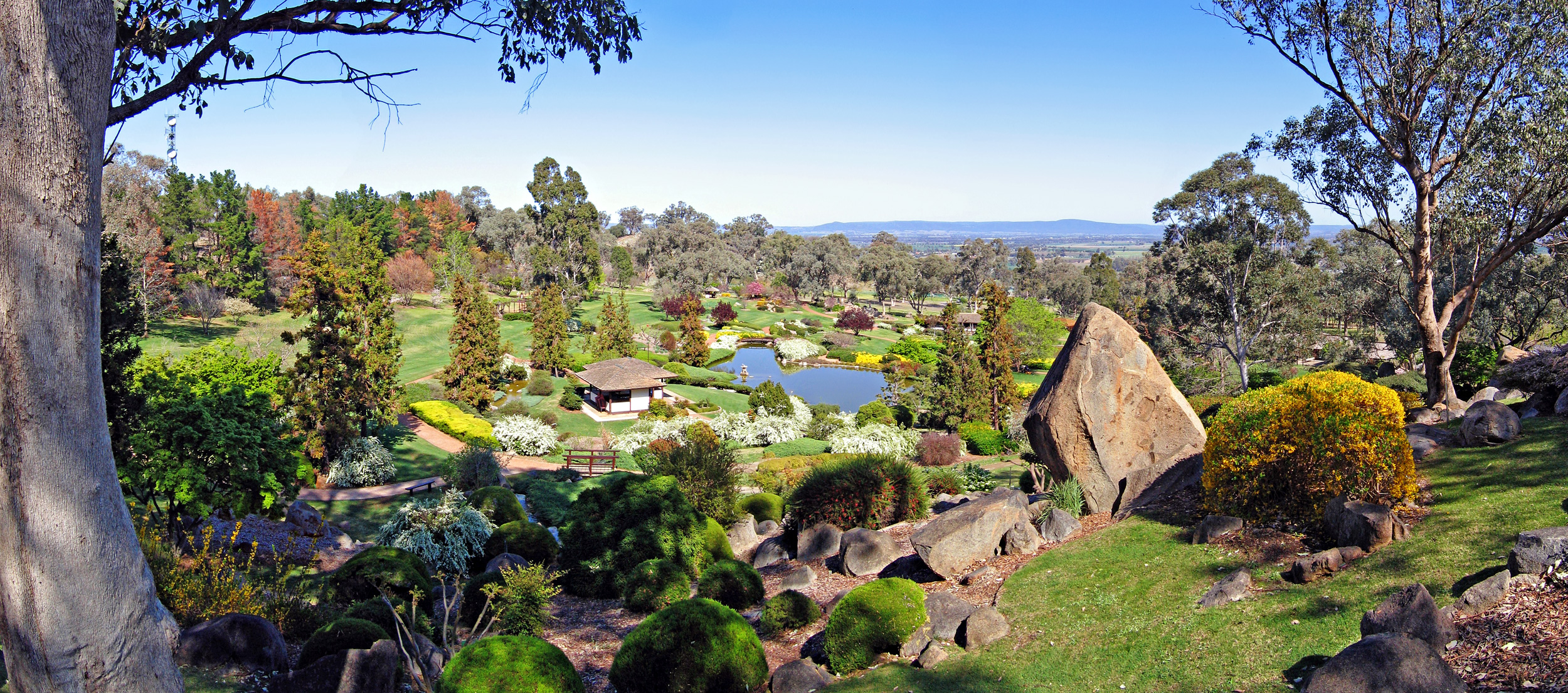
Panoramic view from the Symbolic Mountain at the Cowra Japanese Garden and Cultural Centre

During World War II, a prisoner of war (POW) camp near the town of Cowra in New South Wales, Australia, was the site of one of the largest prison escapes of the war, on 5 August 1944. During the Cowra breakout and the subsequent rounding up of POWs, four Australian soldiers and 231 Japanese soldiers died and 108 prisoners were wounded. The Japanese War Cemetery holding the dead from the breakout was tended after the war by members of the Cowra RSL and ceded to Japan in 1963. In 1971 the Cowra Tourism Development decided to celebrate this link to Japan and proposed a Japanese garden for the town. The Japanese government agreed to support this development as a sign of thanks for the respectful treatment of their war dead; the development also received funding from the Australian government and private entities.

The garden was designed by Ken Nakajima (1914–2000), a world-renowned designer of Japanese gardens at the time. The first stage was opened in 1979, and the second stage in 1986. The gardens were designed in the style of the Edo period and are a kaiyū-shiki or strolling garden. They are designed to show all of the landscape types of Japan. At five hectares (12 acres), the Cowra Japanese Garden is the largest Japanese garden in the Southern Hemisphere. An annual cherry blossom festival during September is now a major event in Cowra's tourism calendar.

== Brazil ==
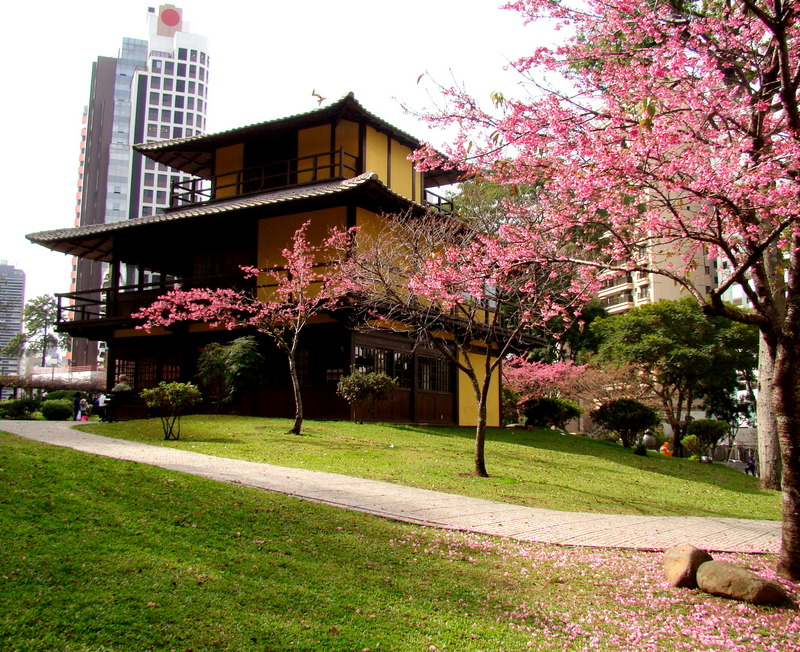
Cherry blossom in Praça do Japão (Japan Square), Curitiba, Brazil

With the Japanese diaspora to Brazil, many immigrants brought seedlings of cherry trees. In São Paulo State, home to the largest Japanese community outside Japan, it is common to find them in Japan-related facilities and in home gardens, usually the cultivars Prunus serrulata 'Yukiwari' and Prunus serrulata var. lannesiana 'Himalaya'. Some cities, such as Garça and Campos do Jordão, have annual festivals to celebrate the blooming of the trees and Japanese culture. In Parana State (in southern Brazil), cities also received many of these immigrants, who planted trees in Apucarana, Maringá, and Cascavel, and especially in the capital city of Curitiba.

In the Curitiba, the first seedlings were brought by Japanese immigrants in the first half of the 20th century, and large numbers were planted in the 1990s with the opening of the Botanical Garden of Curitiba. Nowadays, seedlings are produced locally and used in afforestation of streets and squares. In Praça do Japão (Japan Square) there are more than 30 cherry trees that were sent by the Empire of Japan to Curitiba.

== Canada ==
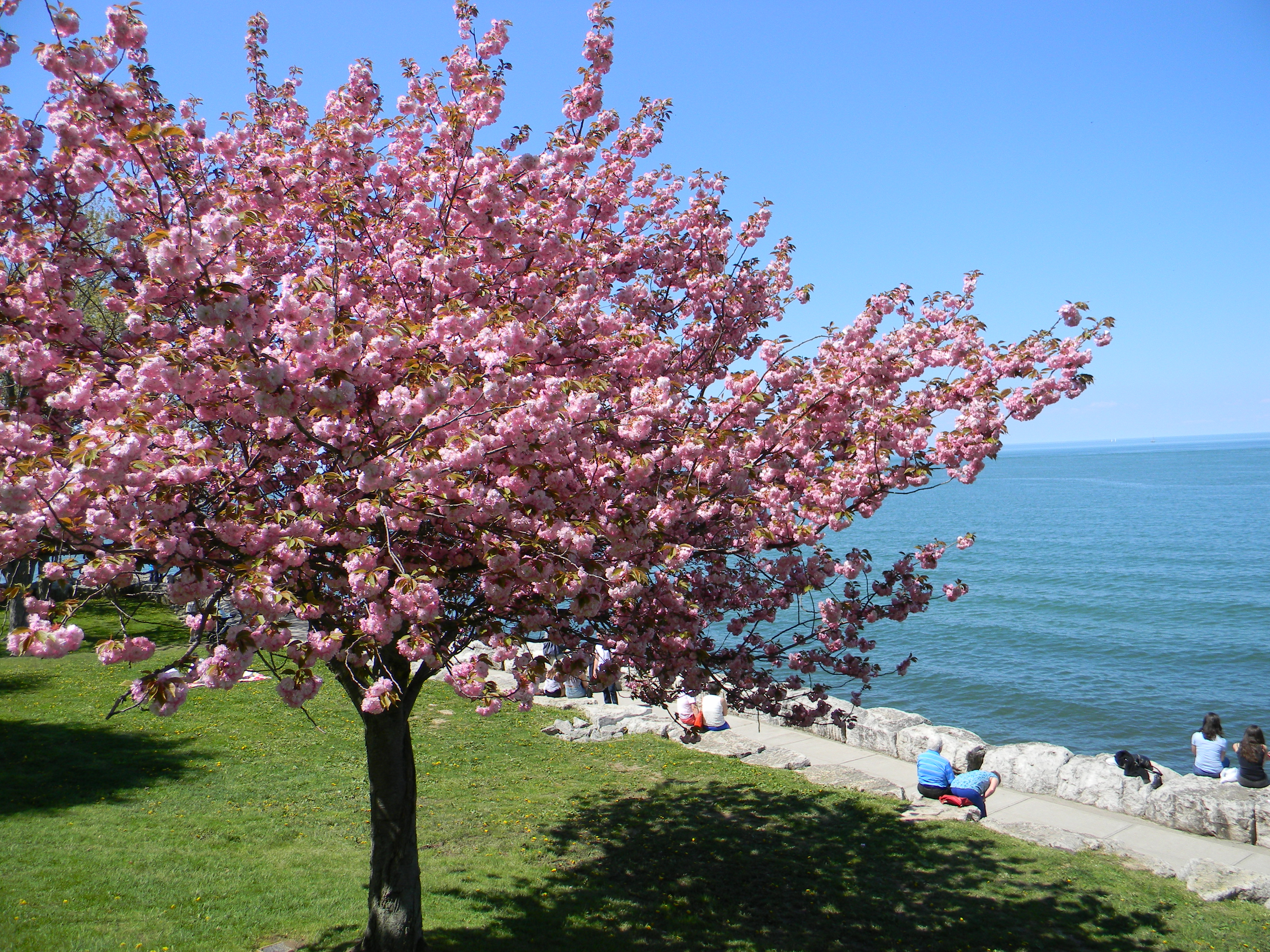
Cherry blossoms in Canada, Niagara-on-the-Lake, Ontario

Vancouver, British Columbia, is famous for its thousands of cherry trees (estimated 50,000) lining many streets and in many parks, including Queen Elizabeth Park and Stanley Park. Vancouver holds the Vancouver Cherry Blossom Festival every year.

High Park in Toronto, Ontario, features many Somei-Yoshino cherry trees that were given to Toronto by Japan in 1959. Through the Sakura Project, the Japanese Consulate donated a further 34 cherry trees to High Park in 2001, plus cherry trees to various other locations like Exhibition Place, McMaster University, York University (near Calumet College and on Ottawa Road near McLaughlin College) and the University of Toronto's main campus (next to Robarts Library) and Scarborough campus. Niagara Falls has many trees near the falls themselves. Royal Botanical Gardens in Burlington and Hamilton was also the recipient of several Somei-Yoshino cherry trees donated as part of the Sakura Project. The trees are located in the Arboretum and the Rock Garden and were planted to celebrate the continual strengthening of friendship between Japan and Canada. Peak bloom time at the Royal Botanical Gardens is normally around the last week of April or the first week of May.

== China ==
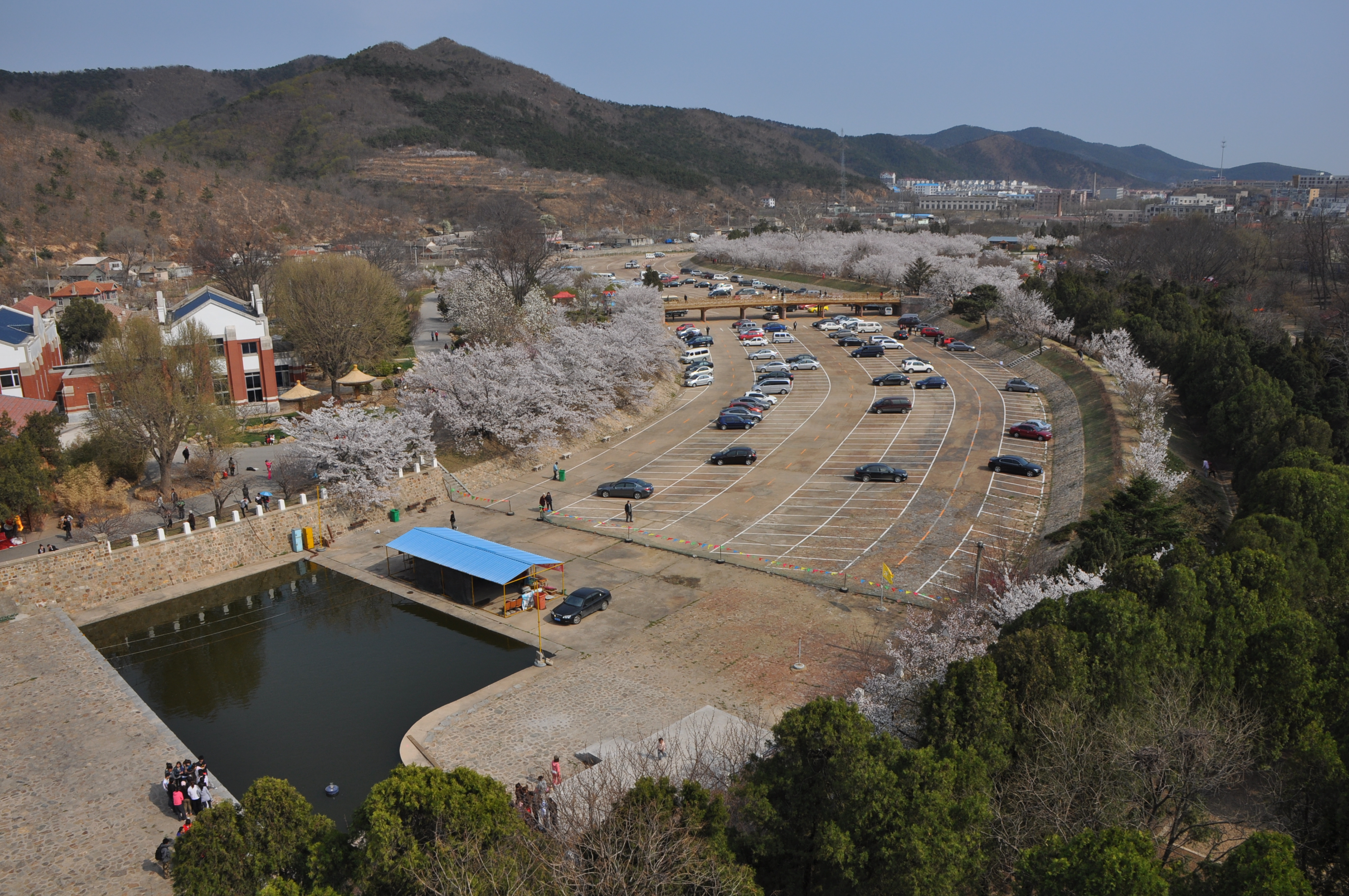
Longwangtang Cherry Blossom Park in Liaoning, China

Cherry trees grow naturally in the middle northern and southern parts of China, where they are known as yinghua (櫻花) in Chinese.

Some of the most famous cherry blossom parks in China reflect Japan's brief occupation of parts of China during the first half of the 20th century or donations from Japan. During the Second Sino-Japanese War, twenty-eight cherry blossom trees were planted at Wuhan University by Japanese troops. After the war it was decided that the trees would be preserved despite their historical implications. In 1972, as China–Japan relations normalized, about 800 trees were donated to Wuhan University. Other donations added to their numbers in the following years. Currently, Wuhan University has about one thousand cherry blossom trees of different kinds. 80% of these cherry trees are direct descendants of trees planted by the Japanese. In 2020, when cherry blossom viewing became impossible due to the spread of COVID-19, updates on the flowering of cherry trees at Wuhan University were posted on the Web and viewed a total of 750 million times.

Gifts of cherry blossoms trees have also signified friendship between China and Japan. In 1973, the year following the Japan–China Joint Communiqué, Japan sent cherry trees to China as a symbol of friendship, and they were planted in Yuyuantan Park in Beijing. After that, further trees were propagated and planted, and the park became famous for cherry blossoms.

In 1997, the Japanese Michinoku Bank and arborist Kazio Saito planned to open a cherry blossom park in Wuhan City for the sake of the friendship between the two countries, and the Japanese city of Hirosaki, home to Hirosaki Park famous for its cherry blossoms, began to advise Wuhan City on the planting and cultivation of cherry trees. In 2016 Wuhan City and Hirosaki City signed a friendship agreement. East Lake Cherry Blossom Park opened in 2001, and 2.5 million people came to see the blossoms in 2018. There are sixty kinds of cherry trees, including Yoshino cherry and weeping cherry.

International Cherry Blossom Week in Wuxi began in the 1980s, when Keishiro Sakamoto and Kiyomi Hasegawa, Japanese citizens, planted 1,500 cherry trees in the China-Japan Friendship Cherry Blossom Forest. As of 2019, the Friendship Cherry Blossom Forest attracts 500,000 viewers each year, and is home to 100 kinds of cherry trees.

At the beginning of the 21st century, the popularity of cherry blossoms in China rapidly increased due to an increase in the number of visitors to Japan and the spread of SNS, and many cherry blossom parks have opened throughout China. According to statistics from 2019, the number of cherry blossom-related tourists reached 340 million and the amount spent exceeded 60 billion yuan.

Some notable cherry blossom sites in China include:

- Longwangtang Cherry Blossom Park in Lushun, Dalian, Liaoning
- East Lake Cherry Blossom Park near Wuhan University, in Donghu District, Wuhan, Hubei
- Wuhan University, in Donghu District, Wuhan, Hubei
- Nanshan Botanical Garden in Nan'an District, Chongqing
- Pingba Cherry Blossom Park in Guizhou
- Yuantouzhu in Wuxi

== Denmark ==
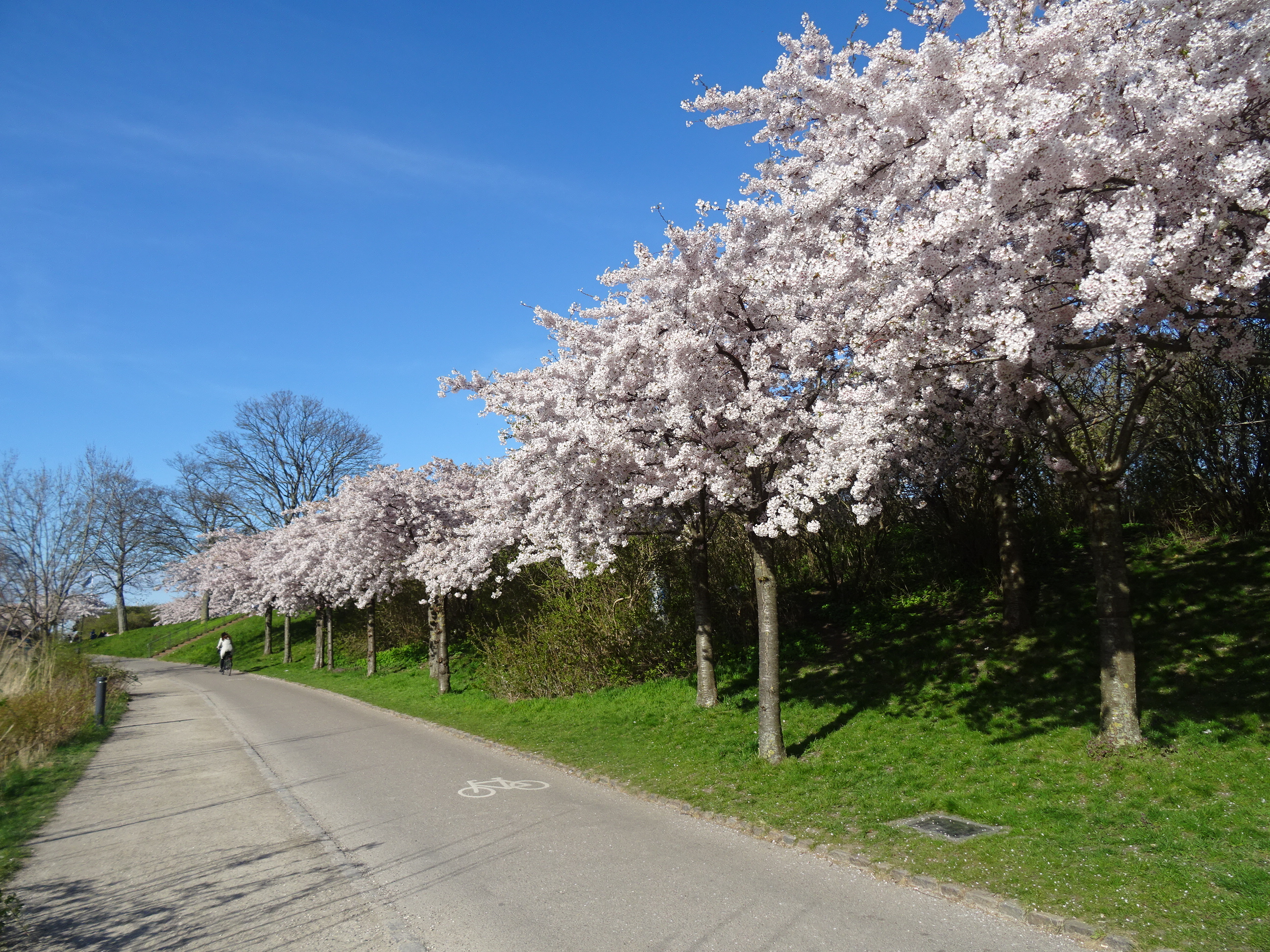
Cherry blossoms at Langelinie in Copenhagen, Denmark, in spring.

In Denmark, cherry blossoms are chiefly ornamental flowering cherries grown in parks, gardens, and urban landscapes rather than native Danish trees; many are Japanese flowering cherries, including cultivars of Prunus serrulata, a temperate East Asian species that is widely cultivated outside its native range.

In Denmark, cherry blossoms are especially associated with spring displays in Copenhagen, most notably in Langelinie Park and Bispebjerg cemetery, where 200 cherry trees form the basis of the annual Copenhagen Sakura Festival. According to the Embassy of Japan in Denmark, the trees were donated in 2005 by Seiichi Takaki, president of Andersen Bakery, on the occasion of the bicentenary of Hans Christian Andersen's birth. Their successful cultivation in Denmark is supported by the country’s cool spring climate, while horticultural guidance for Prunus serrulata recommends full sun and moist but well-drained, moderately fertile soil.

== France ==
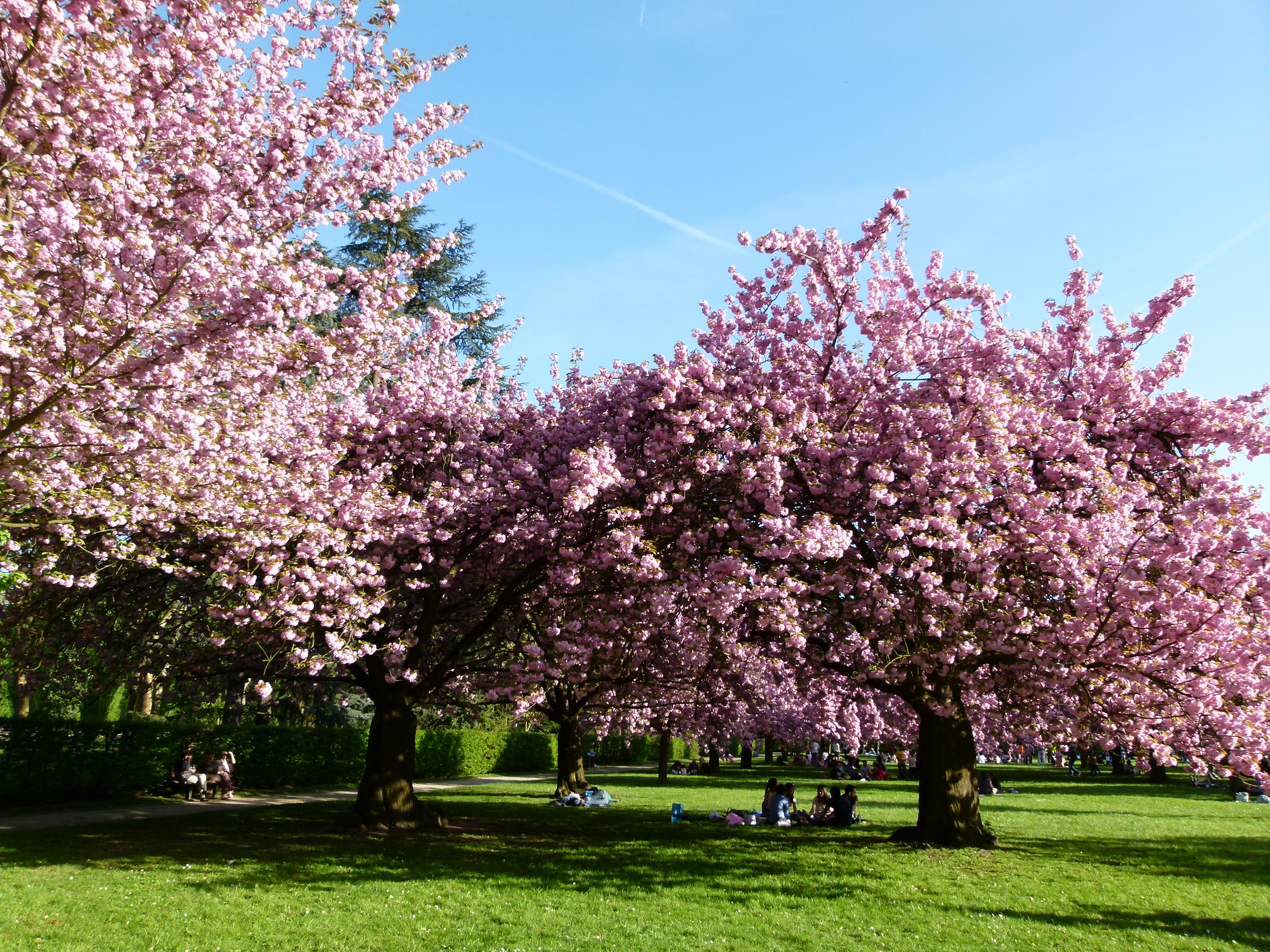
Blooming cherry blossom trees in Parc de Sceaux, France

Parc de Sceaux, located in a suburb of Paris, has two orchards of cherry trees, one for white cherry blossoms (Prunus avium) and one for pink cherry blossoms (Prunus serrulata). The orchards combined make up 264 trees, which attract many visitors when they bloom in early April. Additional plantings are present in the capital along the Seine River, near Notre-Dame de Paris, and in the Bastille area.

== Germany ==
Cherry blossoms are a major tourist attraction in Germany's Altes Land orchard region. The largest Hanami in Germany, organized by the German-Japanese society, with Japanese-style fireworks, takes place in Hamburg every spring.

In 1990, Japan donated cherry blossoms to be planted along prior sections of the Berlin Wall, to express appreciation for the German reunification. The gift was supported by donations from the Japanese people allowing over 9,000 trees to be planted. The first trees were planted in November of that year near the Glienicke Bridge.

The Cherry Blossom festival in the Bonn Altstadt (Kirschblütenfest Bonn) is also very famous.

Starting in 2015, Hamburg was allowed to bestow the title of "Cherry Blossom Queen" by the Japan Cherry Blossom Association, one of only three cities worldwide to receive this privilege. The first Cherry Blossom Queen of Hamburg was crowned by the Cherry Blossom Queen of Japan on 23 May 2015.

== India ==
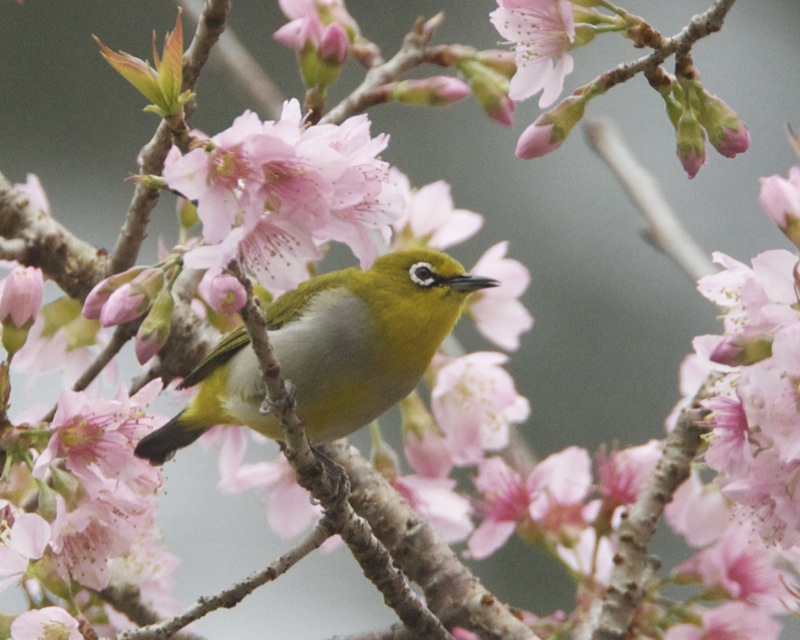
Prunus cerasoides is a species of wild Himalayan cherry tree, common in India.

In India, cherry blossoms are a notable attraction in Himalayan states like Himachal Pradesh, Uttarakhand, Jammu and Kashmir, Sikkim and northern districts of West Bengal, namely Jalpaiguri and Darjeeling, as well as Nagaland, Manipur and the tropical highlands of Garo Hills and Khasi Hills in Meghalaya, where Prunus cerasoides is native. These states are notable for Prunus cerasoides trees, called wild cherry blossom trees, which cover the Himalayan foothills and bloom twice a year during the spring and autumn months. They can also be seen in various British-era botanical gardens, especially in the Nilgiri Hills in the Western Ghats in southern India. The flowers bloom every six months, between January and late March, and between late September and November.

Prunus cerasoides, called wild Himalayan cherry, Indian wild cherry, and sour cherry, is known in Hindi as padam, pajja, or padmakashtha. Among Hindus in Himachal Pradesh and Uttarakhand, it is considered sacred and associated with Vishnu and Shiva. During Maha Shivaratri, the leaves are used to make a wreath with wild citrus fruits, which is hung at the prayer altar. The leaves are also used as incense.

Some cherry blossom festivals are held in India during October–November, when Prunus cerasoides blooms. Shillong is notable for its cherry blossom festival during the autumn.

== Indonesia ==
In Indonesia, cherry blossoms can be found in the Cibodas Botanical Garden in West Java. These trees are of the Prunus cerasoides species. Cibodas Botanical Garden belongs to the tropical rain forest climate, and the trees begin to flower in January, followed by full flowering in February, and the flowers start to fall in March. The second flowering period begins in June and peaks in August, and the flowers fall in October.

== Korea ==
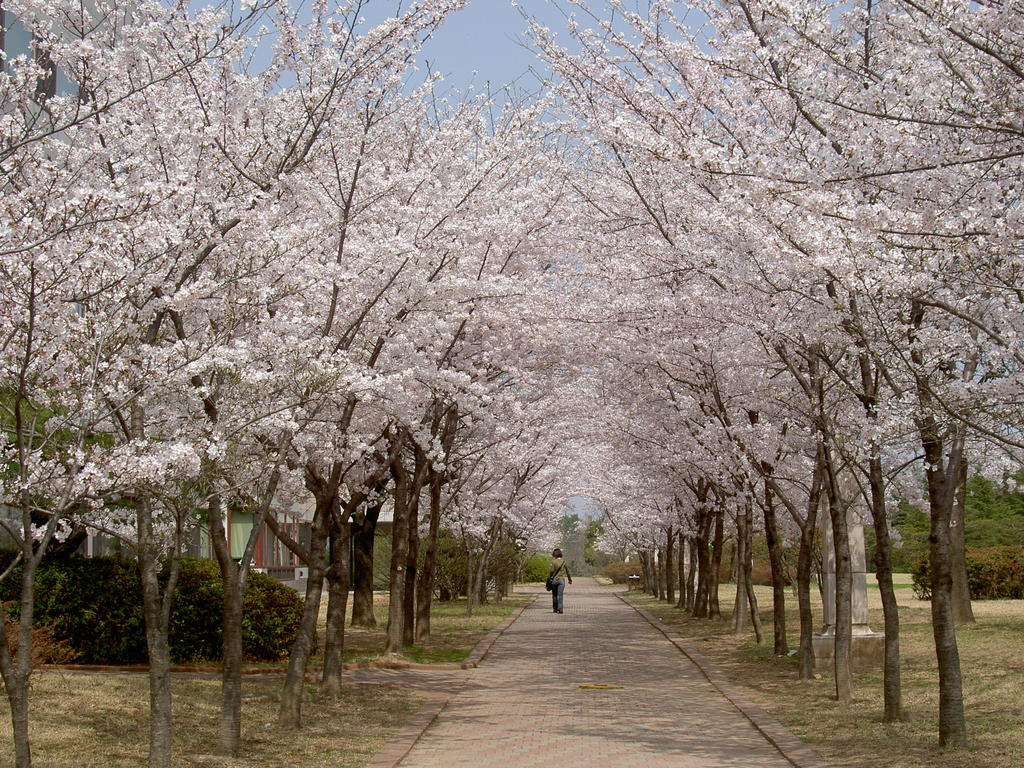
Cherry blossoms at POSTECH in Pohang, South Korea

Cherry trees have been used in Korea in making bows and woodblocks (Palman Daejanggyeong). According to tradition, monks used wood from silver magnolias, white birches, and cherry trees from the Southern coast of the peninsula for these purposes. The Japanese planted Yoshino cherry trees at Seoul's Changgyeonggung Palace during Japanese rule. Cherry blossom viewing festivals continued in Korea even after the Japanese surrendered at the end of World War II, but they have been controversial, and many cherry trees were cut down to celebrate the fiftieth anniversary of the Japanese surrender, as they were seen as symbols of the occupation. Even still, Koreans continue to plant cherry trees and festivals attract a wide range of tourists, and cherry blossoms in Korea are associated with purity and beauty.

From the start of the 21st century, there have been disputes related to assertions that the Yoshino cherry is the same species as a Korean indigenous, endangered species called the King cherry, whose mass cultivation was being studied at the time. In 2007, a genetic analysis comparing King cherry and Yoshino cherry trees concluded that the trees are distinct species, and in 2016, another DNA study suggested independent origins of the King cherry and Yoshino cherry. Later that year, the new scientific name Cerasus × nudiflora was given to the King cherry to distinguish it from the Yoshino cherry (Prunus × yedoensis).

In Korea, most of the sites for cherry blossom festivals, including Yeouido and Jinhae, are still planted with Yoshino cherry trees. According to the results of a survey published in 2022, most of the cherry trees planted in the National Assembly area and Yeouido, two of the capital's most famous cherry blossom viewing spots, were Japanese Yoshino cherry trees, including 90.4% of the cherry trees in the National Assembly area and 96.4% in Yeouido, and none were Korean King cherry trees. Based on the results of this survey, King Cherry Project 2050, an incorporated association, plans to gradually replace Yoshino cherry trees with King cherry by around 2050. In addition, more than 90% of the cherry trees in Jinhae, famous for its cherry blossom festival, are Yoshino cherry trees, imported from Japan in the 1960s, and many others have been found to be Japanese weeping cherry trees. It has been suggested that these also be replaced with the King cherry.

== Myanmar ==
Cherry blossoms are found in the temperate regions of Myanmar. The town Pyin Oo Lwin, known as "The Land of Cherries", is famous for its cherry blossoms during the spring. Some cherry trees, genetically modified to be able to survive in the tropical climate, were also planted in Yangon, the commercial capital, as part of a friendship program with Japan.

== Netherlands ==
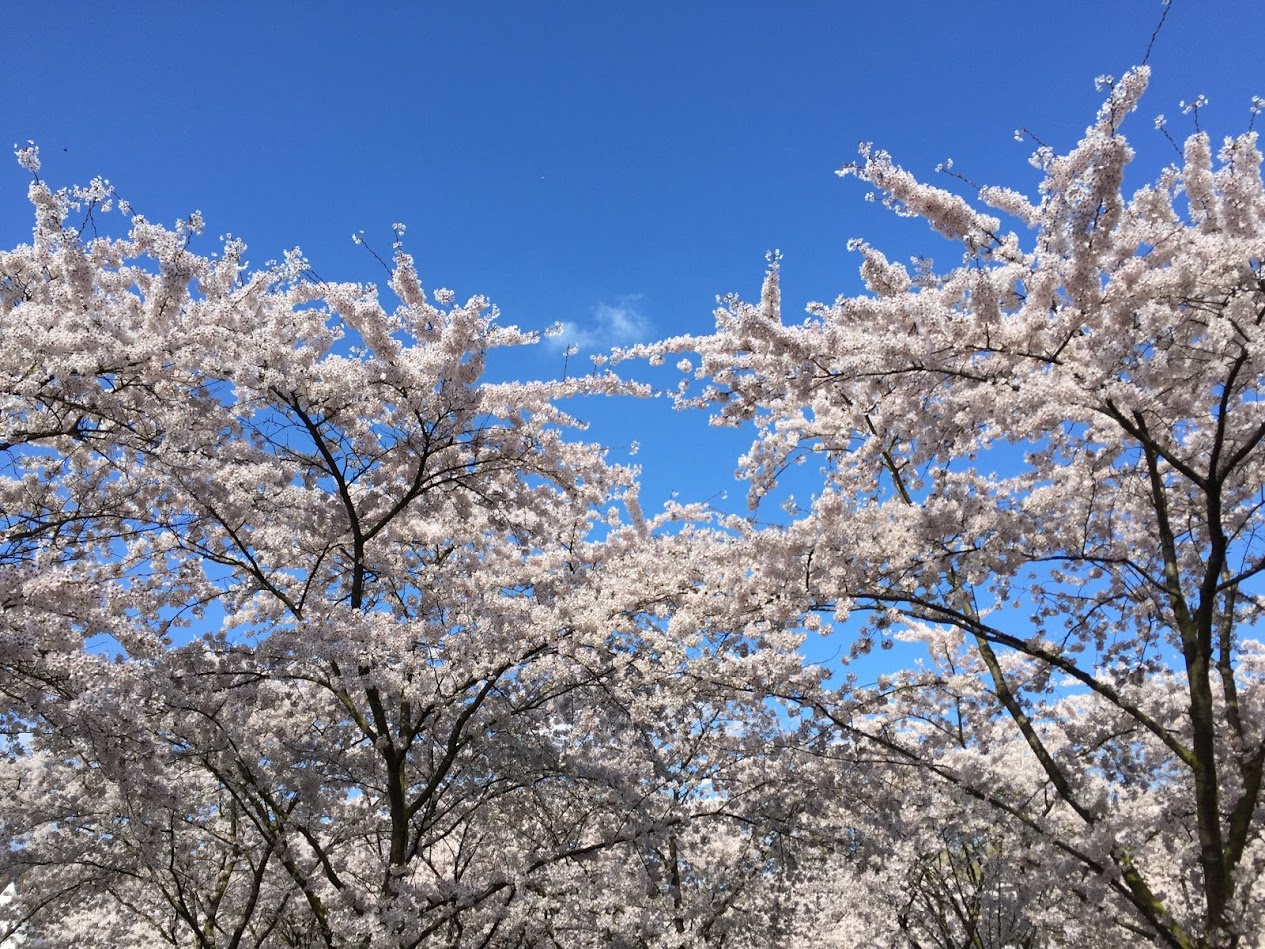
Cherry blossoms in the Amsterdamse Bos

In the year 2000, the Japan Women's Club (JWC) donated 400 cherry blossom trees to the city of Amstelveen. The trees have been planted in the cherry blossom park in the Amsterdamse Bos. Every tree has a name — 200 trees have female Japanese names, and 200 trees have female Dutch names. At the annual April event, JWC members wear kimono and celebrate the cherry blossoms in the park.

== New Zealand ==
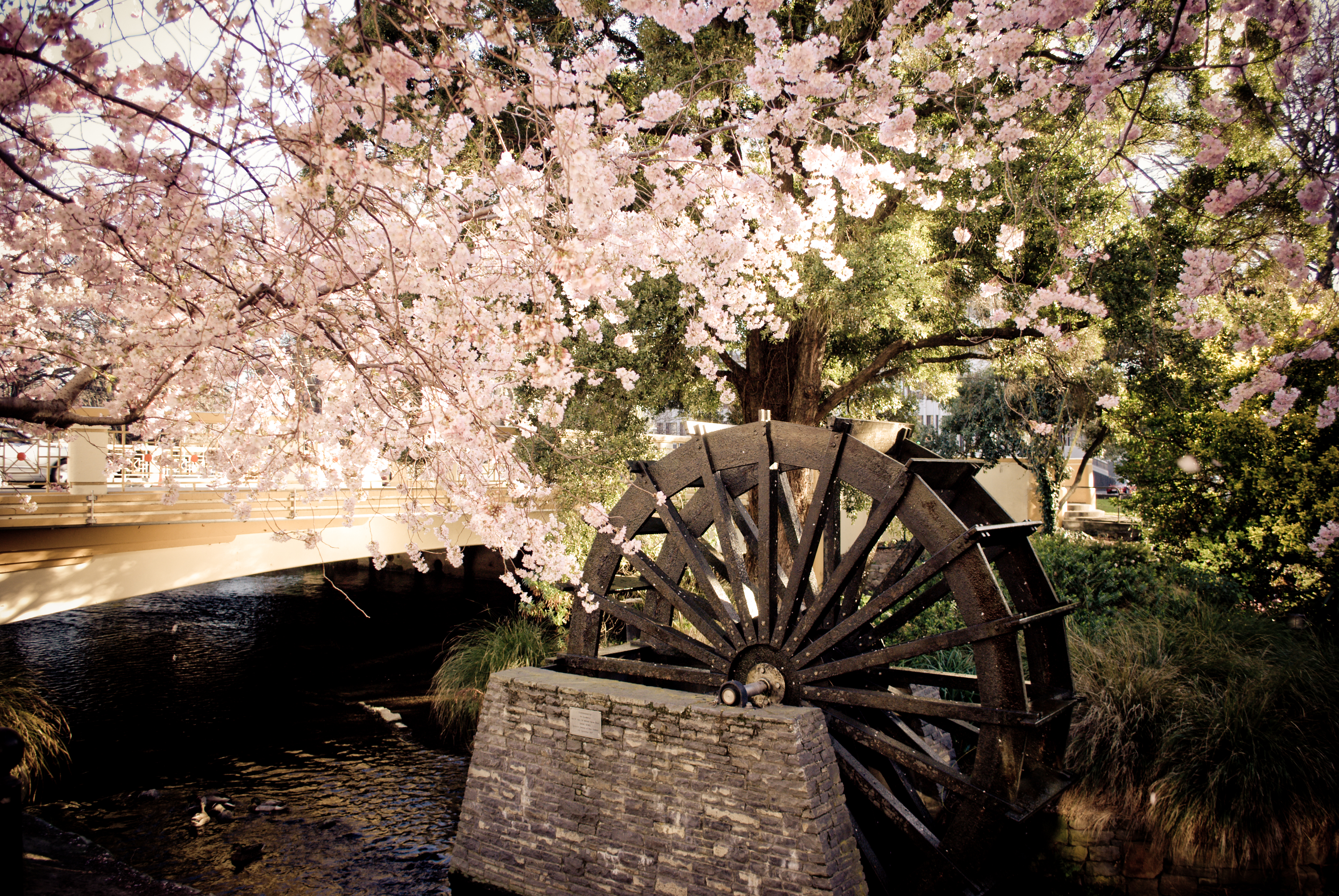
Cherry blossoms and water wheel in Hagley Park

Hagley Park is the largest urban open space in Christchurch, New Zealand and has many cherry blossom trees of several varieties. Aston Norwood Gardens, north of Wellington, has the largest number of Prunus × yedoensis cherry blossom trees in New Zealand.

== Spain ==
El Cerezo en Flor is a cherry blossom festival that takes place annually in Valle del Jerte, in the province of Cáceres, Extremadura. More than 1500 cherry fruit trees bloom in the valley between approximately March 15 and April 10, starting with trees lower down in the valley. The flowers last about 10 days. During the week when the flowers are in bloom, the eleven villages in the valley celebrate their historical and current culture, gastronomy, and architecture. Traditional homes, forges, and wine cellars open their doors to the public. It has been designated a Fiesta of National Tourist Interest.

The village of Alfarnate in Andalusia (near Málaga) is known for its cherry orchards, and holds a cherry festival (Festival de la Cereza) each year in June. The village noticed that people from the Japanese community in Spain were visiting in April to view the cherry blossoms, and in 2022 they decided to hold their first cherry blossom festival. The Sakura Alfernate festival was expanded in 2023, with the backing of the Japanese embassy, to include lectures on sakura and Japanese culture, and workshops and demonstrations of Japanese art, music, and martial arts. The 2023 festival was held on April 15 and 16. Along with its 4000 cherry fruit trees, the village has a garden of 47 cherry blossom trees.

== Taiwan ==
Typically found in mountainous areas, cherry blossoms are a popular attraction in Taiwan, with numerous specially tailored viewing tours. Among the most easily accessible and thus most popular locations for viewing them are Yangmingshan, in Taipei, and Wuling Farm, in Taichung.

== Thailand ==
Native wild cherry blossoms of the species Prunus cerasoides are found in Northern Thailand, in addition to growing throughout the Himalayas. Over 100,000 trees of this species were planted in 2010 in Phu Hin Rong Kla National Park, at the mountainous region of Phu Lom Lo, a grassland previously used for farming cabbages.

== Turkey ==
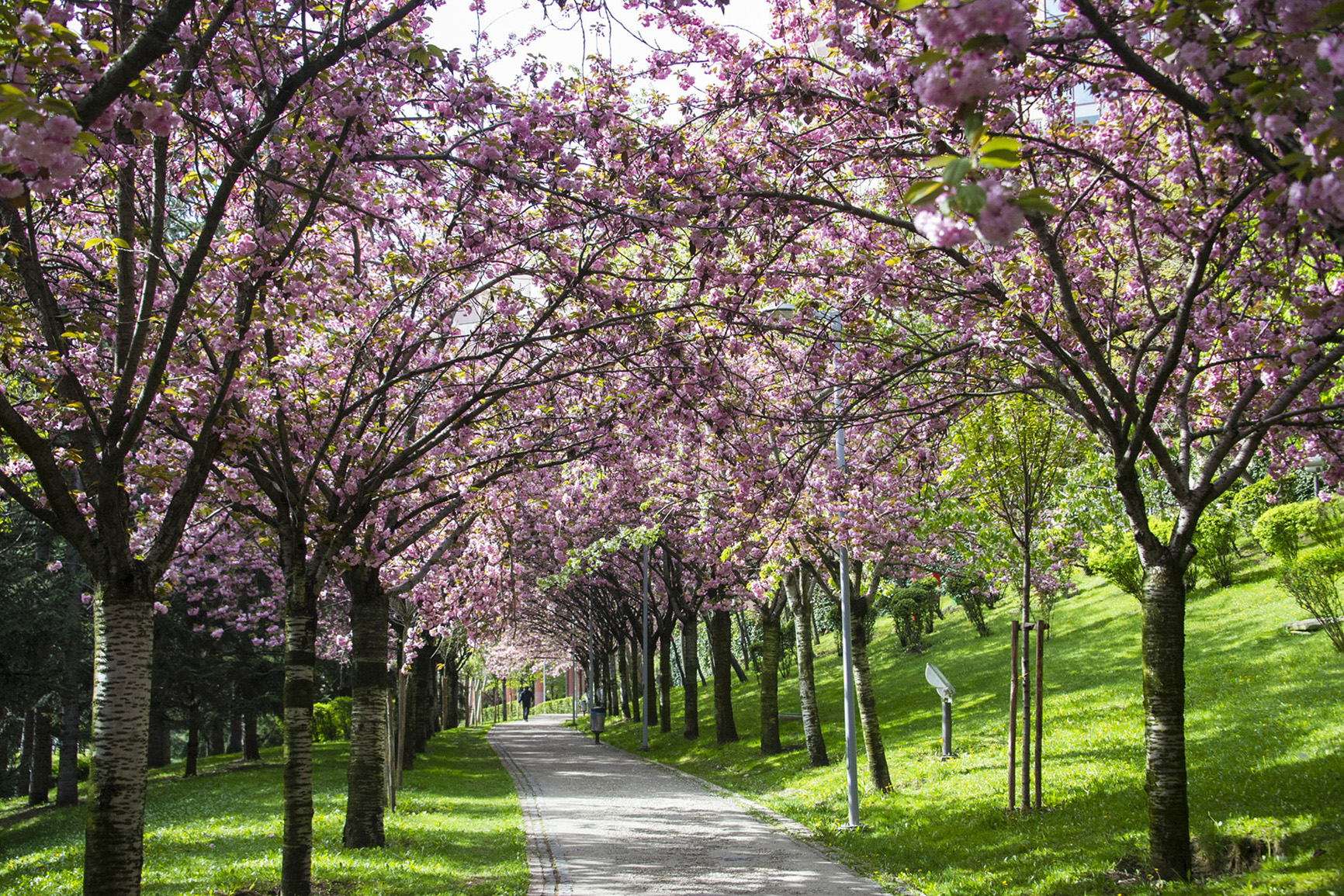
Cherry blossoms in Ankara, Turkey

In 2005, Japanese cherry trees were presented by Japan to the Nezahat Gökyiğit Botanical Garden in Istanbul, Turkey. Each tree represents one sailor of the frigate Ertuğrul, a famous frigate of the Ottoman Turkish navy which sank on the way back from a goodwill visit to Japan in 1890 due to a typhoon. 587 Ottoman Turkish sailors were lost, but the Japanese Coast Guard saved 67 sailors, and their return to Turkey formed the foundation for the relationship between the two countries. The Japanese cherry trees represent the memory of those who died and provide annual remembrance.

== United Kingdom ==
From the late 19th century to the early 20th century, Collingwood Ingram collected and studied Japanese cherry blossoms and created various cultivars such as Okame and Kursar. Ingram's work allowed Taihaku, a cultivar that had disappeared in Japan in the early 20th century, to return to Japan.

Cherry trees are widely cultivated in public and private gardens throughout the UK, where the climate is well suited to them. Batsford Arboretum in Gloucestershire, England holds the national collection of Japanese village cherries in the Sato-zakura Group. Keele University in Staffordshire, England has one of the UK's largest collections of flowering cherries, with more than 150 varieties. The Royal Horticultural Society has given its prestigious Award of Garden Merit to many flowering cherry species and cultivars.

In March 2020, in the first national lockdown during the COVID-19 pandemic in England, the National Trust initiated the #BlossomWatch campaign, inspired by cherry blossom festivals in Japan. The campaign encouraged people to share images of the first signs of Spring, in particular blossoms, on lockdown walks. The campaign was repeated in 2021 and 2022.

One cherry blossom tree on private land in Newmarket, Suffolk is in memory of the Japanese racehorse Vodka, who passed away in Newmarket in 2019 during her breeding career from laminitis, and marks where half of her ashes are buried. During her racing career, she won seven G1 races in Japan, including the 2007 Tokyo Yūshun (Japanese Derby), where she became the first filly since Kurifuji in 1943 to win the race, and the 2009 Japan Cup. A statue of her is also outside the Tokyo Racecourse in Fuchu.

== United States ==
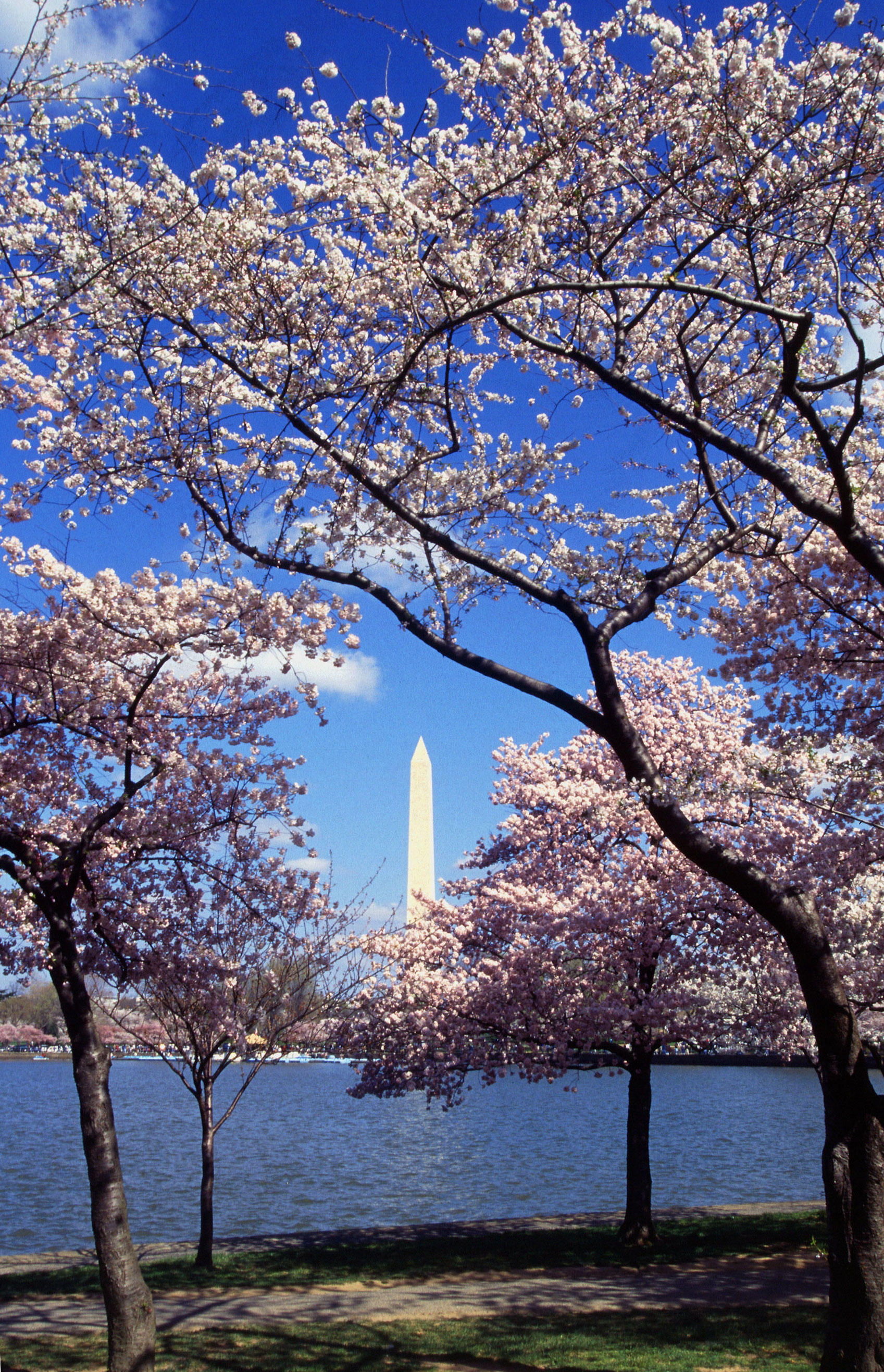
Cherry blossoms in Washington, D.C.

Eliza Ruhamah Scidmore introduced the idea of planting Japanese cherry trees in Washington, D.C., a vision that became a reality in 1912. Japan gave 3,020 flowering cherry trees as a gift to the United States in 1912 to celebrate the growing friendship between the two countries, replacing an earlier gift of 2,000 trees that had to be destroyed due to disease in 1910. These trees were planted in Sakura Park in New York, and lined the shore of the Tidal Basin and the roadway in East Potomac Park in Washington, D.C. The first two original trees were planted by the first lady Helen Taft and Viscountess Chinda on the bank of the Tidal Basin. The gift was renewed with another 3,800 trees in 1965. In Washington, D.C. the cherry blossom trees continue to be a popular tourist attraction (and the subject of the annual National Cherry Blossom Festival) when they reach full bloom in early spring. Just outside of Washington, the suburb of Kenwood in Bethesda, Maryland, has roughly 1,200 trees, which are popular with locals and tourists.

New Jersey's Branch Brook Park, which is maintained by Essex County, is the oldest county park in the United States and is home to the largest collection of cherry blossom trees in one US location, with about 5,000.

Balboa Park in San Diego has 1,000 cherry blossom trees that blossom in mid- to late March. In Los Angeles, over 2,000 trees are located at Lake Balboa in Van Nuys. These trees were donated by a Japanese benefactor, and were planted in 1992; however, the trees in this area have been dying off due to drought conditions.

Philadelphia is home to over 2,000 flowering Japanese cherry trees, half of which were a gift from the Japanese government in 1926 in honor of the 150th anniversary of American independence, with the other half planted by the Japan America Society of Greater Philadelphia between 1998 and 2007. Philadelphia's cherry blossoms are located within Fairmount Park, and the annual Subaru Cherry Blossom Festival of Greater Philadelphia celebrates the blooming trees. The University of Washington in Seattle also has cherry blossoms in its quadrangle.

The Japanese American Historical Plaza located in Tom McCall Waterfront Park in Portland, Oregon has one hundred cherry blossoms in the park, which were planted during the construction of the park in 1990.

Other US cities have an annual cherry blossom festival (or sakura matsuri), including the International Cherry Blossom Festival in Macon, Georgia, which features over 300,000 cherry trees. The Brooklyn Botanic Garden in New York City also has a large, well-attended festival. Portsmouth, New Hampshire is the site of the peace conference that produced the Treaty of Portsmouth, for which the original Washington, D.C. cherry trees were given in thanks. Several cherry trees planted on the bank of the tidal pond next to Portsmouth City Hall were the gift of Portsmouth's Japanese sister city of Nichinan—the hometown of Marquis Komura Jutarō, Japan's representative at the conference. Ohio University in Athens, Ohio, has 200 somei yoshino trees, a gift from its sister institution, Japan's Chubu University.

== Vietnam ==
In Vietnam, cherry blossoms are scarce, concentrated mainly in the northern mountainous provinces and the Central Highlands. These trees are mainly of the kanhizakura variety. In Da Lat, there is a type of cherry blossom belonging to the kanhizakura x okamezakura variety, scientifically named prunus cerasoides, commonly known as mai anh dao, wild mai, or cherry blossom. In 2013, the Japanese government gifted Vietnam a number of cherry blossom trees to commemorate the cooperative relationship between the two countries. These cherry trees from Japan were planted at the Japanese Embassy on Lieu Giai Street, Hanoi, and in Sapa. In 2019, some cherry trees gifted by Japan bloomed in Hanoi and Ho Chi Minh City.
