= Cherry blossoms in Portland, Oregon =

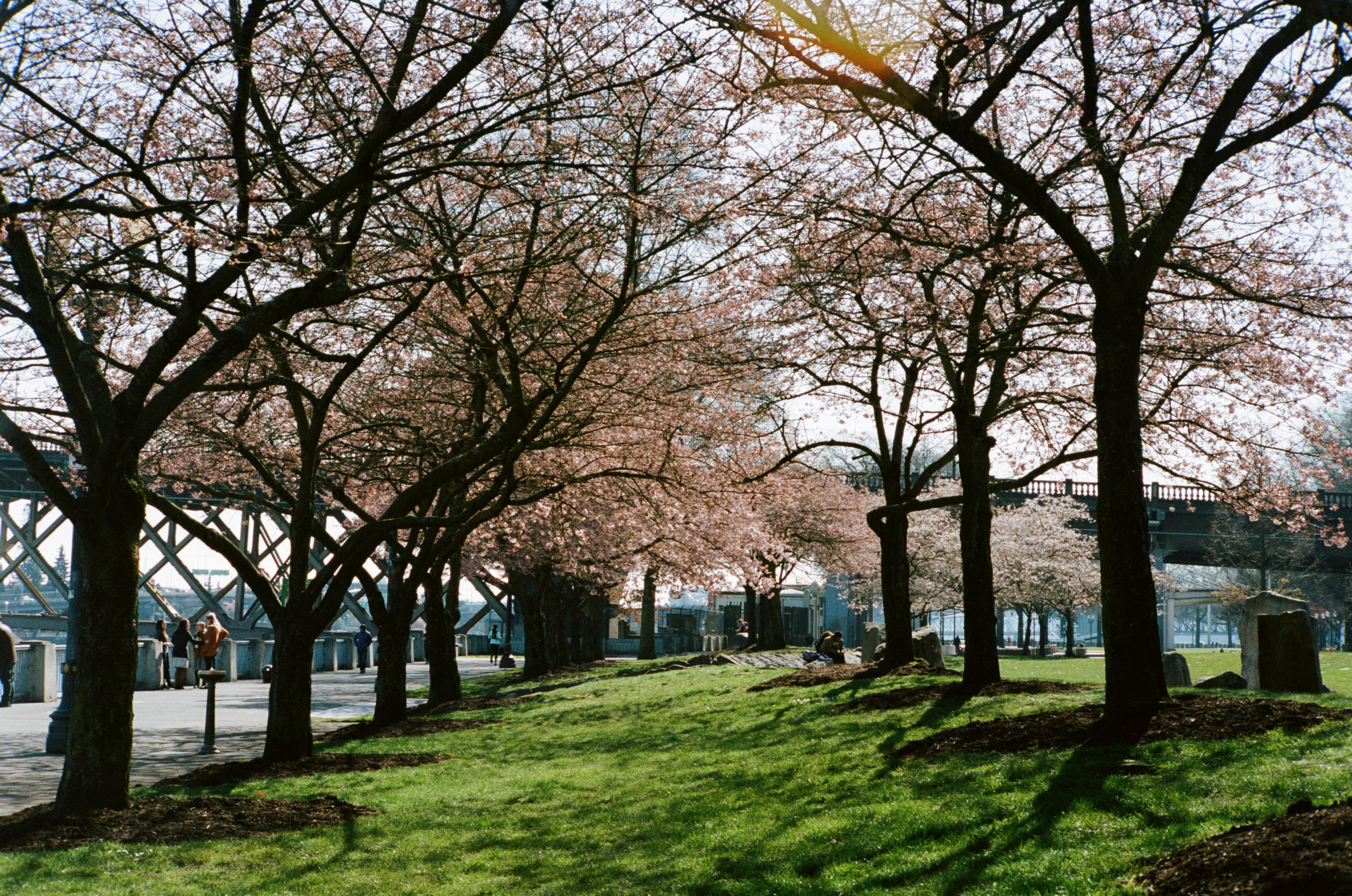
Cherry blossoms at Tom McCall Waterfront Park, 2020

Cherry blossoms play an important role in the American city of Portland, Oregon. In 2024, Country Living ranked Portland number 24 in a list of the 30 best places for viewing cherry blossoms in the U.S. Portland also ranked second in Time Out magazine's 2024 list of the nation's 13 best places for cherry blossom viewing. In 2026, Chiara Profenna of The Oregonian said the city's cherry blossom season is "both an ephemeral experience and a Portland treasure".

The most popular site for viewing cherry blossoms is the Japanese American Historical Plaza at the north end of Tom McCall Waterfront Park, which attracts thousands of visitors annually. Other viewing sites in the city include the Portland Japanese Garden and Hoyt Arboretum in Washington Park, as well as Reed College, the University of Portland, Laurelhurst Park, Mount Tabor, and Pittock Mansion.

== History and viewing sites ==
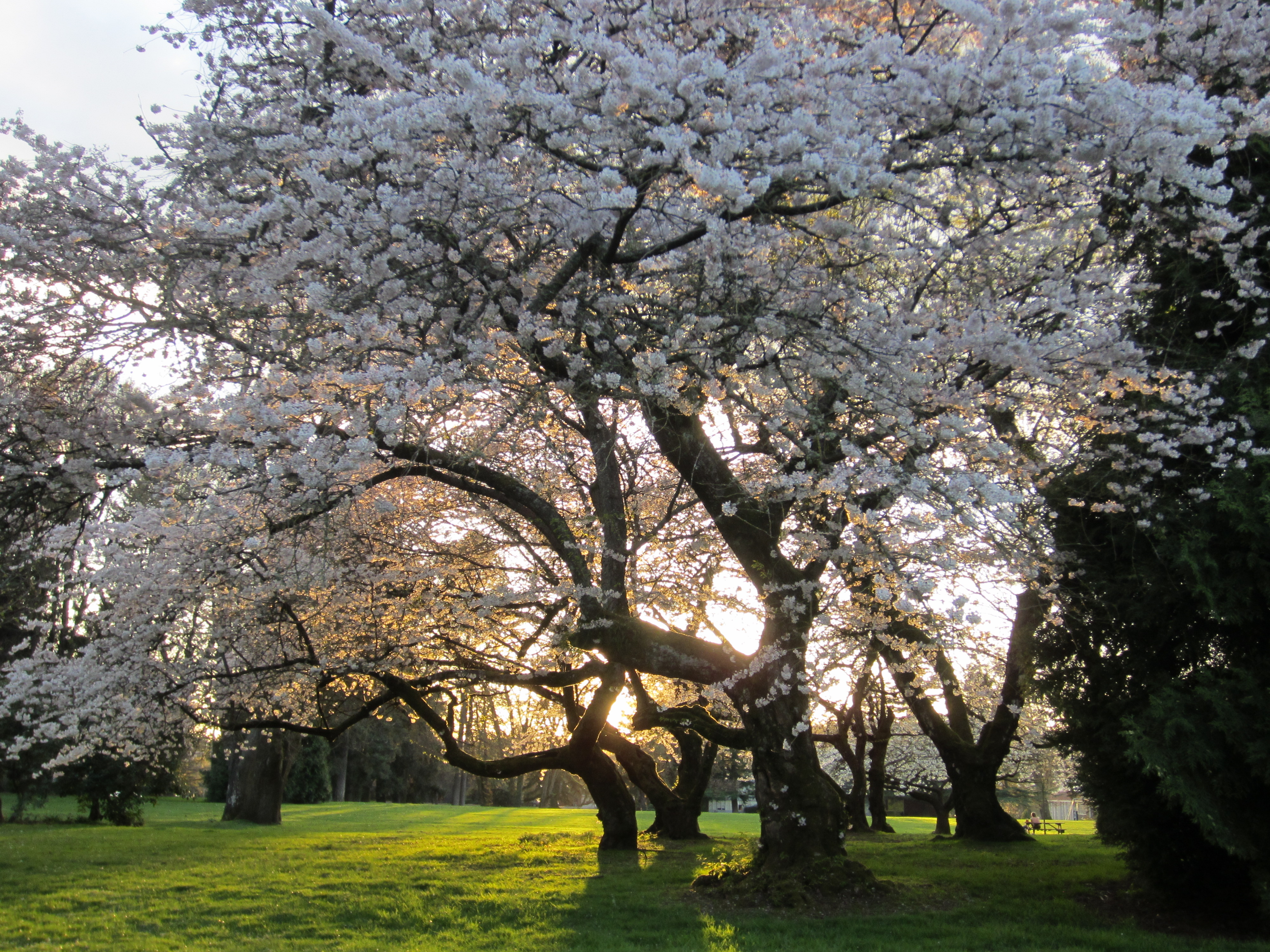
Cherry blossoms at Reed College, southeast Portland, in 2013

The most popular sites for cherry blossom viewing are the Japanese American Historical Plaza at the north end of Tom McCall Waterfront Park as well as the Portland Japanese Garden in Washington Park. Cherry blossoms are also found on the campuses of Reed College and the University of Portland. On the Reed College campus, cherry trees are at Eliot Circle. Chiara Profenna of The Oregonian said the University of Portland campus has one of the city's " most underrated" displays, with cherry trees lining the walking paths of the academic quad. There are approximately 60 cherry trees at Washington Park's Hoyt Arboretum. Among varieties in the arboretum is the Shirofugen cultivar. There are some cherry trees at Laurelhurst Park and at Mount Tabor. Pittock Mansion has cherry trees dating back to 1914.

Cherry blossoms have also been displayed at Lan Su Chinese Garden. In 2023, the garden hosted a floral arrangement by local florist titled Cherry Blossom Celebration. In 2026, multiple cultural institutions offered "buy one, get one free" admission to people who take selfies with the cherry blossoms at Tom McCall Waterfront Park, including the Japanese American Museum of Oregon (JAMO), Lan Su Chinese Garden, and the Portland Chinatown Museum. Additionally, JAMO is slated to host a cherry blossom bazaar in April 2026.

=== Tom McCall Waterfront Park ===
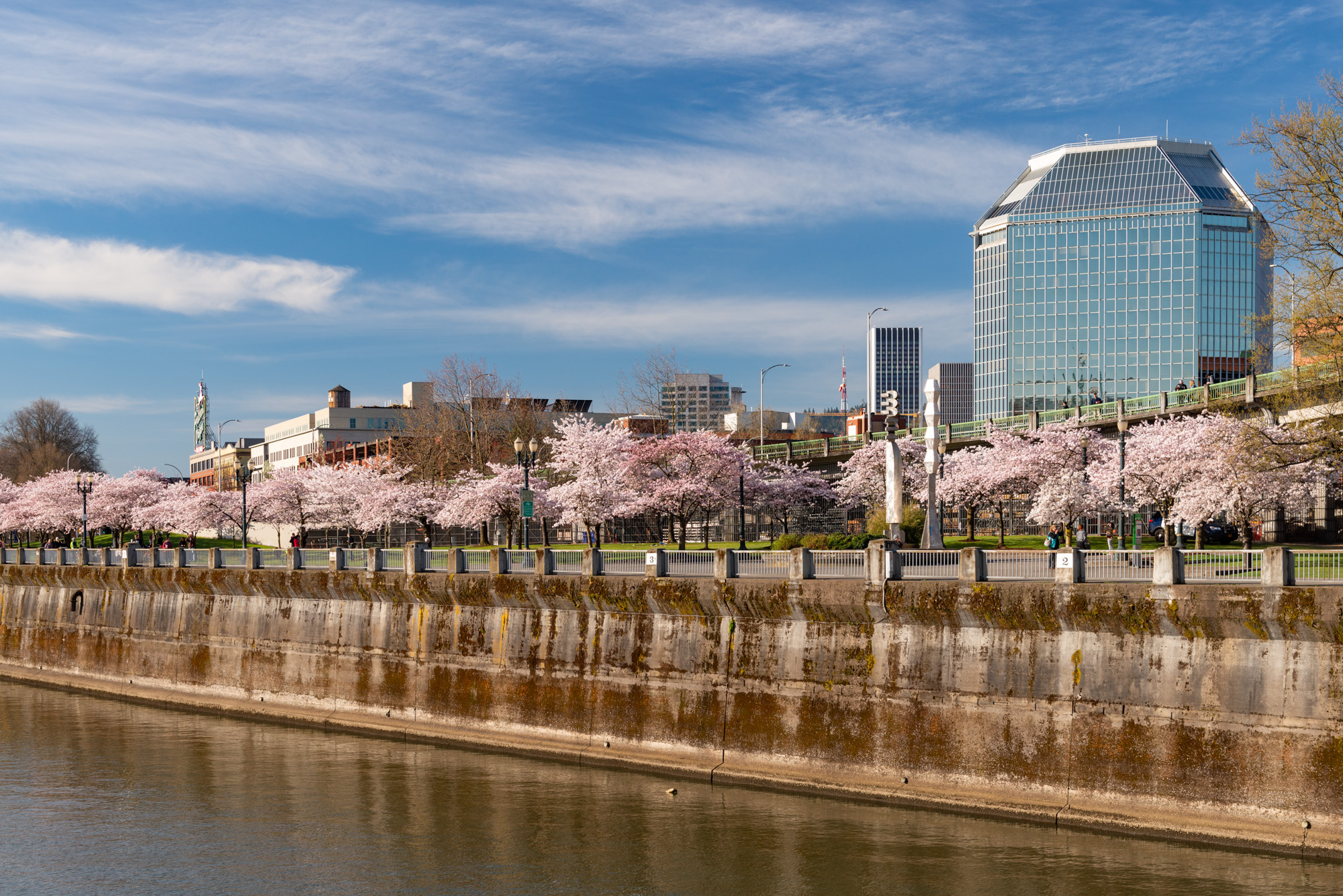
Cherry blossoms along Tom McCall Waterfront Park, 2019

The Japanese American Historical Plaza at the north end of Tom McCall Waterfront Park attracts thousands of people annually for cherry blossom viewing. The area has 100 'Akebono' variety trees donated by Japanese businessmen in 1990 who were members of the Japanese Grain Traders Import Association and worked in local offices. Describing the blooming season, writers for the Portland State Vanguard said in 2023, "It's nearly impossible to visit the waterfront on a weekend evening and not find hundreds of others with the same plans, all strolling under the trees while admiring their beauty and filling up their camera rolls with social media-worthy photos."

In 2015, the Oregon Nikkei Legacy Center hosted the exhibit Sakura Sakura, to start the 25th anniversary celebration of the cherry blossom trees at Waterfront Park. In 2023, Portland Parks & Recreation issued a reminder that vehicles are not allowed on the park's sidewalks after someone used the trees as a backdrop for a car photo shoot. In 2026, some of the cherry blossoms were illuminated with pink lights on select nights. The lights were part of Hollywood Lights' "Ambush Lighting" program and a collaboration with JAMO.

=== Portland Japanese Garden ===
The Portland Japanese Garden has Yoshino cherry trees as well as a weeping cherry, which is planted in the Flat Garden. It also has an area called Cherry Tree Hill, in the Strolling Pond Garden. The garden has a cherry blossom tracker on its website. The placement of the trees was intentional. A staff member said, "They were specifically placed within certain sight lines and views, offering people prime opportunities to stop and take in their beauty." According to The Oregonian, "In 2012, Mari Milgrim, a teacher of Urasenke Tradition of Tea ceremony, served tea in the [Portland Japanese Garden's] Pavilion Gallery to participants of the cherry tree planting ceremony, including Portland Mayor Sam Adams and Consulate-General of Japan in Portland Takamichi Okabe, as part of the nationwide centennial celebration of the National Cherry Blossom Festival." In 2016, a writer for the newspaper said the trees at the park and the Portland Japanese Garden "are beautiful testaments to the Rose City's links with Japan".

== See also ==
- Cherry blossom cultivation by country
- Cherry blossoms in Seattle
- Hanami
- Roses in Portland, Oregon
