= Cherry blossoms in Seattle =

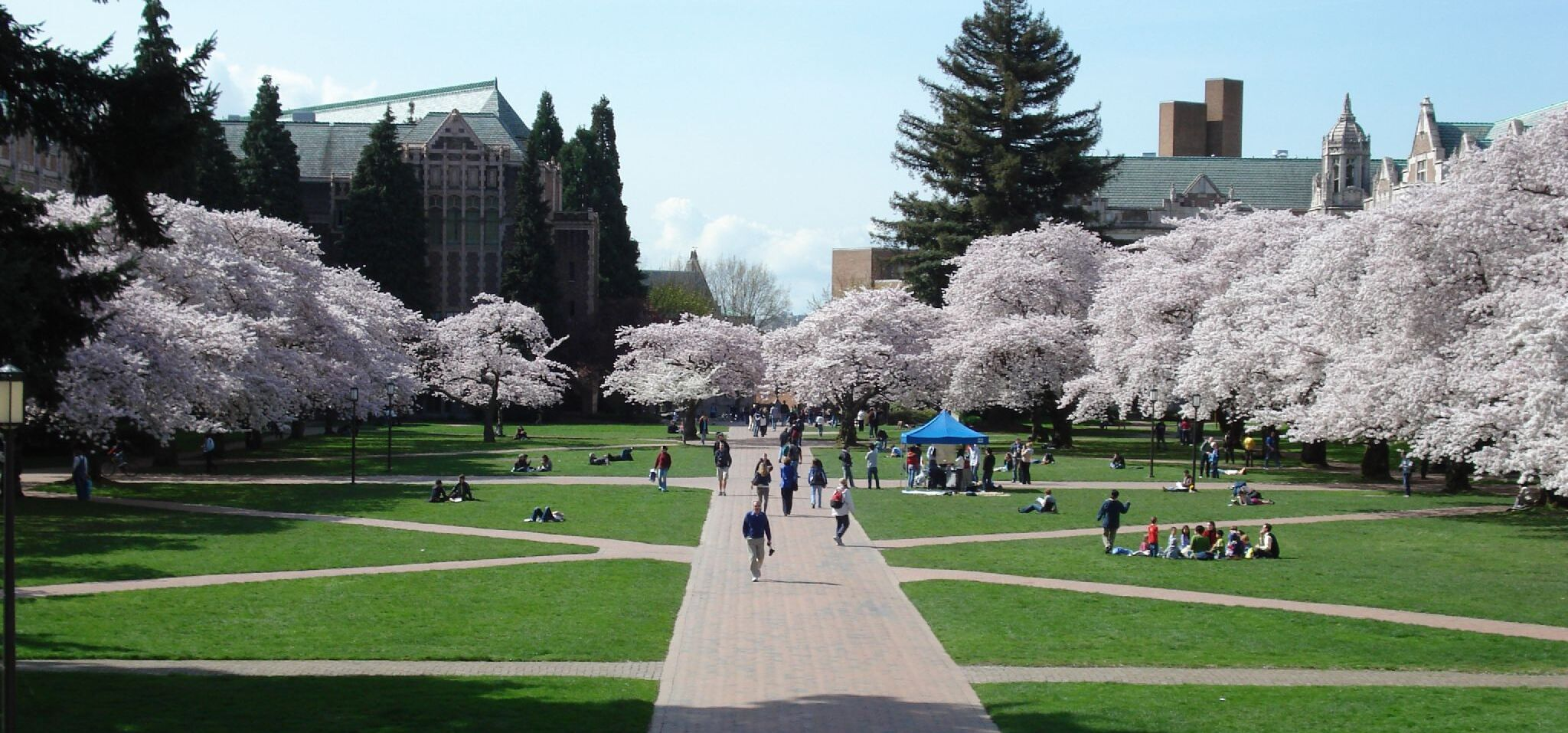
Cherry blossoms on the University of Washington campus in Seattle in 2007

Cherry blossoms play an important role in the city of Seattle, in the U.S. state of Washington. Seattle has more than 1,000 cherry trees donated by Japan as a symbol of friendship. Christine Clarridge of Axios Seattle wrote, "The annual bloom of cherry trees across Seattle symbolizes the end of the dark months and the beginning of spring, drawing residents and swarms of tourists to the city's most popular viewing places." The season's peak varies depending on weather conditions, but generally lasts from January to March. Cherry blossoms are used for beautification purposes and have been as a symbolic gesture of friendship between Japan and the U.S. for more than a century. In 2024, Time Out included Seattle in a list of the thirteen best places for cherry blossom viewing in the United States.

== Viewing sites and associated events ==
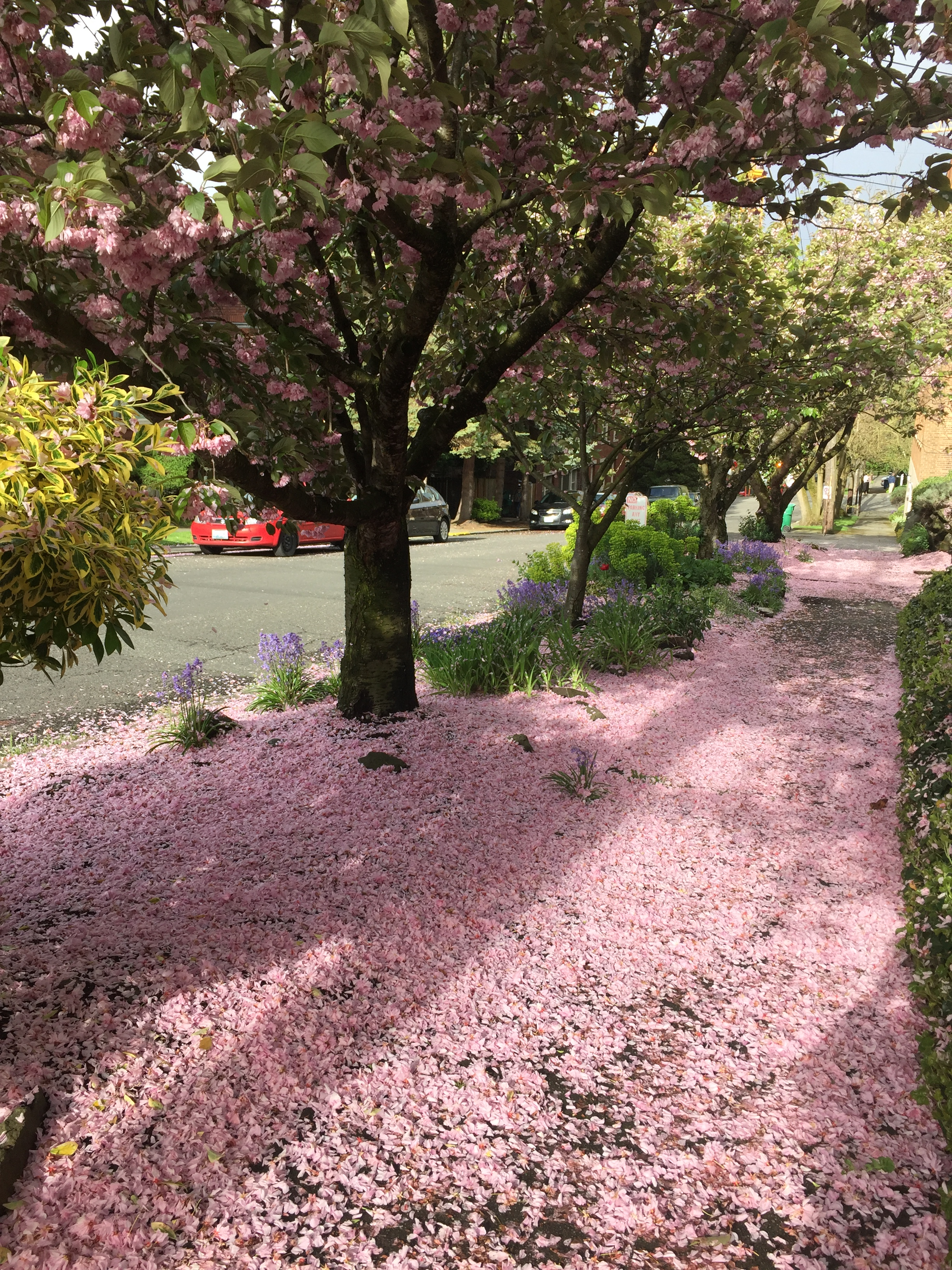
Flowering cherry trees in Queen Anne, 2017

Popular sites for cherry blossom viewing can be found in the University District, at Seattle Center, at Seward Park, as well as a stretch of Lake Washington Boulevard north of the park. The annual Cherry Blossom and Japanese Cultural Festival was established in 1976 following the gift of 1,000 cherry trees to Seattle on behalf of Japan by then prime minister Takeo Miki. The festival was originally held at the park before moving to Seattle Center. Eleven new cherry trees were planted at Seattle Center in February 2024. Other parks with cherry trees include Green Lake Park, Jefferson Park, and Washington Park Arboretum.

The Seattle Japanese Garden has cherry trees. Pike Place Market in downtown Seattle also has cherry trees; eight trees were planted along Pike Street in December 2023. A stretch along 22nd Avenue, between East John Street and East Republican Street, has Chinese double cherry, Kwanzan flowering cherry (Prunus 'Kanzan'), and Yoshino cherry blossoms. Part of Condon Way West, has Kwanzan trees. An area near NE 55th Street and 12th Avenue NE is also known for blossoms.

Outside Seattle, cherry trees can be found throughout the region, including Downtown Bellevue Park, the Washington State Capitol campus in Olympia, and Tacoma's Point Defiance Park.

=== University District ===
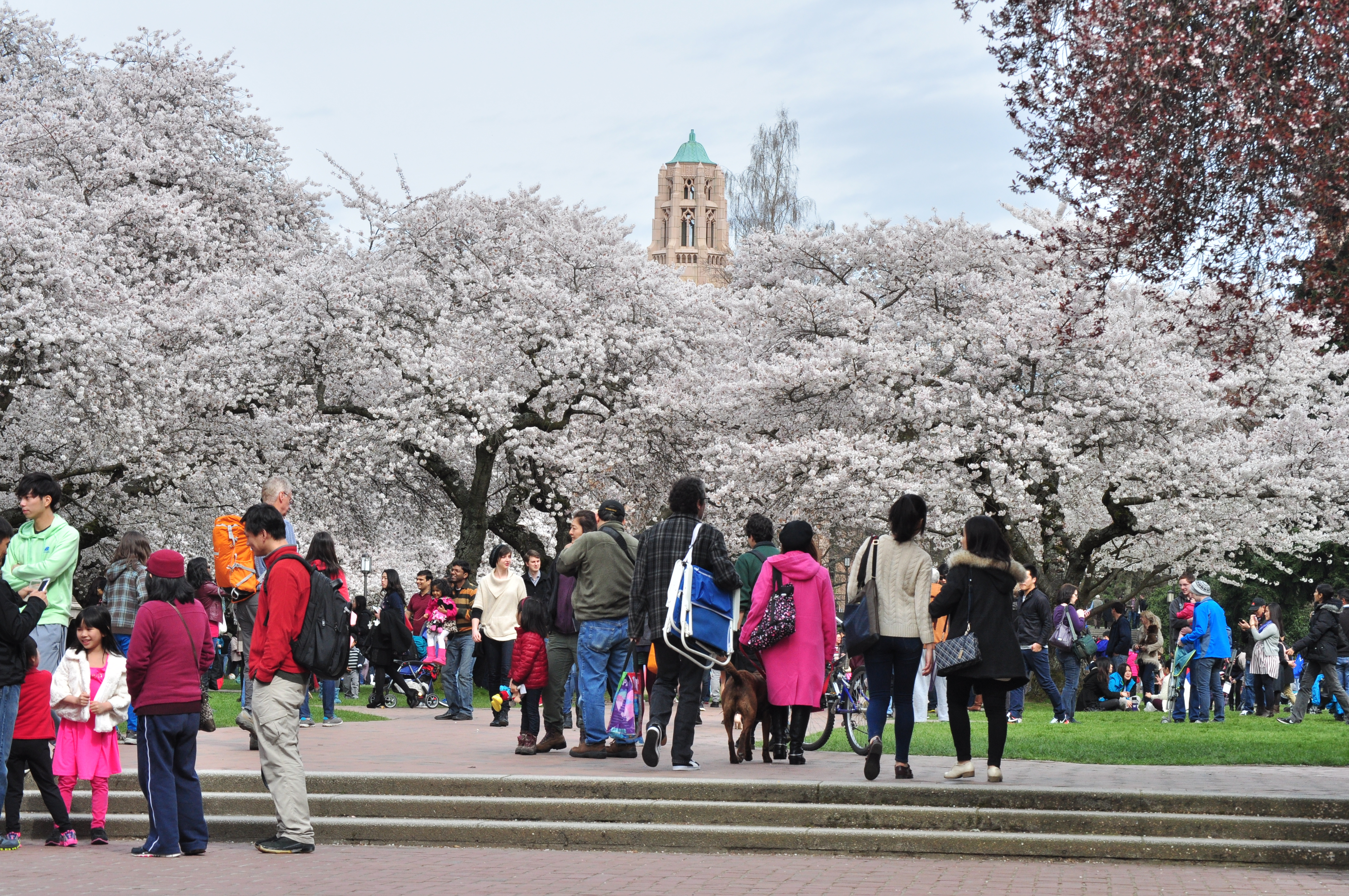
The cherry blossoms on the University of Washington campus are a popular attraction.

The Quad, on the campus of the University of Washington, has 29 Yoshino cherry trees. According to an arborist with the university, "Historically, peak bloom in the Quad typically begins during the third full week of March and goes into the fourth week of March."

Peak viewing season at the Quad can result in increased traffic and limited parking. In 2024, approximately 80 businesses participated in the U District Cherry Blossom Festival, which features "blossom-themed" activities and food options. The Seattle Cherry Blossom Run goes through the campus and Burke-Gilman Trail.

=== Chinatown–International District ===
In the Chinatown–International District, Little Saigon has cherry trees, and Mt. Fuji cherry trees can be found along the northeast edge of Kobe Terrace. In 2024, the Seattle Department of Transportation planted eleven new cherry trees outside the Japanese Cultural and Community Center.

== See also ==
- Cherry blossom cultivation by country
- Cherry blossoms in Portland, Oregon
- Hanami
