= Japan Square =

Public square in Curitiba, Brazil

- Praça do Japão
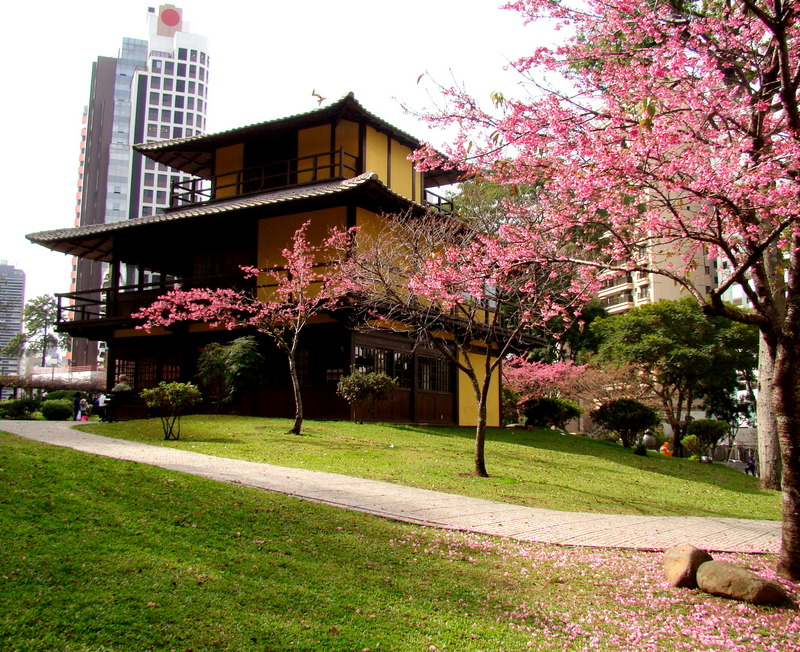
- Interactive map of Japan Square
- Type: Square
- Location: Curitiba, Paraná – Brasil
- Nearest city: Curitiba
- Coordinates: 25°26′45″S 49°17′14″W
- Area: 14,000 m²
- Opened: 1962
- Plants: 30 cherry trees

Japan Square is a public space in the city of Curitiba, the capital of the Brazilian state of Paraná.

It was built in honor of the Japanese immigrants to Brazil who arrived starting in 1910. Paraná has the second-largest Japanese community in Brazil, behind São Paulo, and as of 2023 is home to more than 32,000 of its descendants.

== History ==
The square's construction began in 1958 and was completed in 1962. A renovation in 1993 included the creation of the Japanese Portal and the Japanese Immigration Memorial. The memorial includes the Hideo Handa Library, opened in 2008, in honor of the writer of Japanese descent.

In July 2018, the Tomie Ohtake Space was opened in honor of Japanese-Brazilian artist and sculptor Tomie Ohtake, who died in 2015. A seven-meter-tall red steel sculpture, designed by Ohtake, was installed at the site.

== Design ==
The square sits within a wooded area of 14,000 square meters, and features 30 cherry trees sent by the Japanese Empire and six artificial lakes. A sculpture of Buddha in the center of one of the lakes was placed to symbolize the brotherhood between the cities of Curitiba and Himeji.

There is also a stone-carved lantern, a traditional symbol in Japanese gardens, donated by the legislative assembly of Hyogo, the sister region of Paraná, in 1979.

The square also includes the Tea House and the House of Culture, featuring works of Japanese literature, origami, ikebana, and haiku.

== Image gallery ==
Japan Square

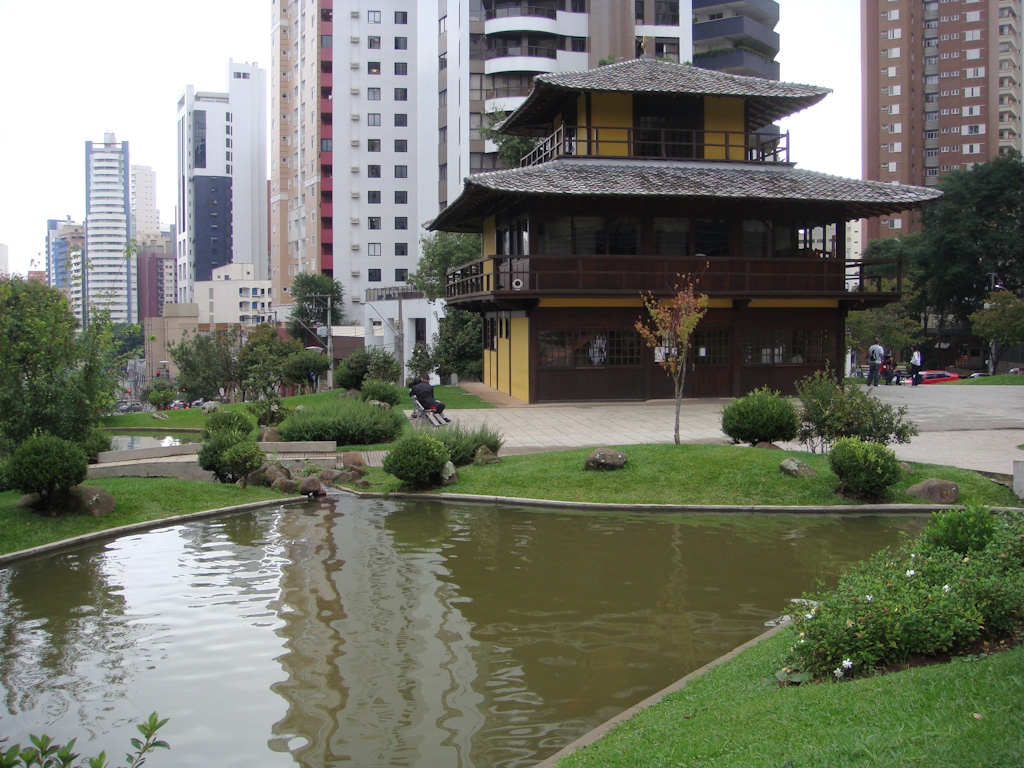
Japanese Immigration Memorial

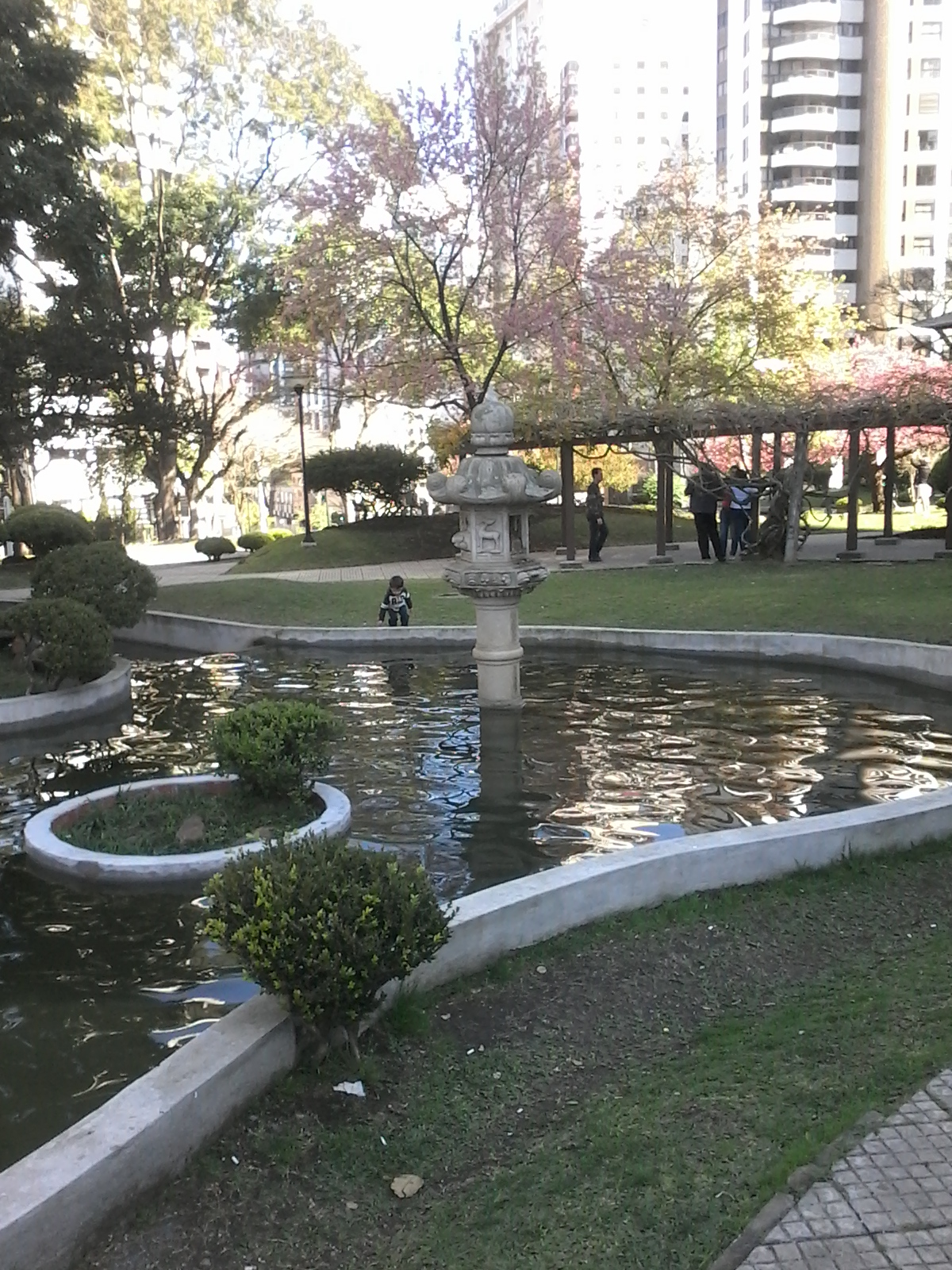
Stone-carved lantern in one of the ornamental lakes

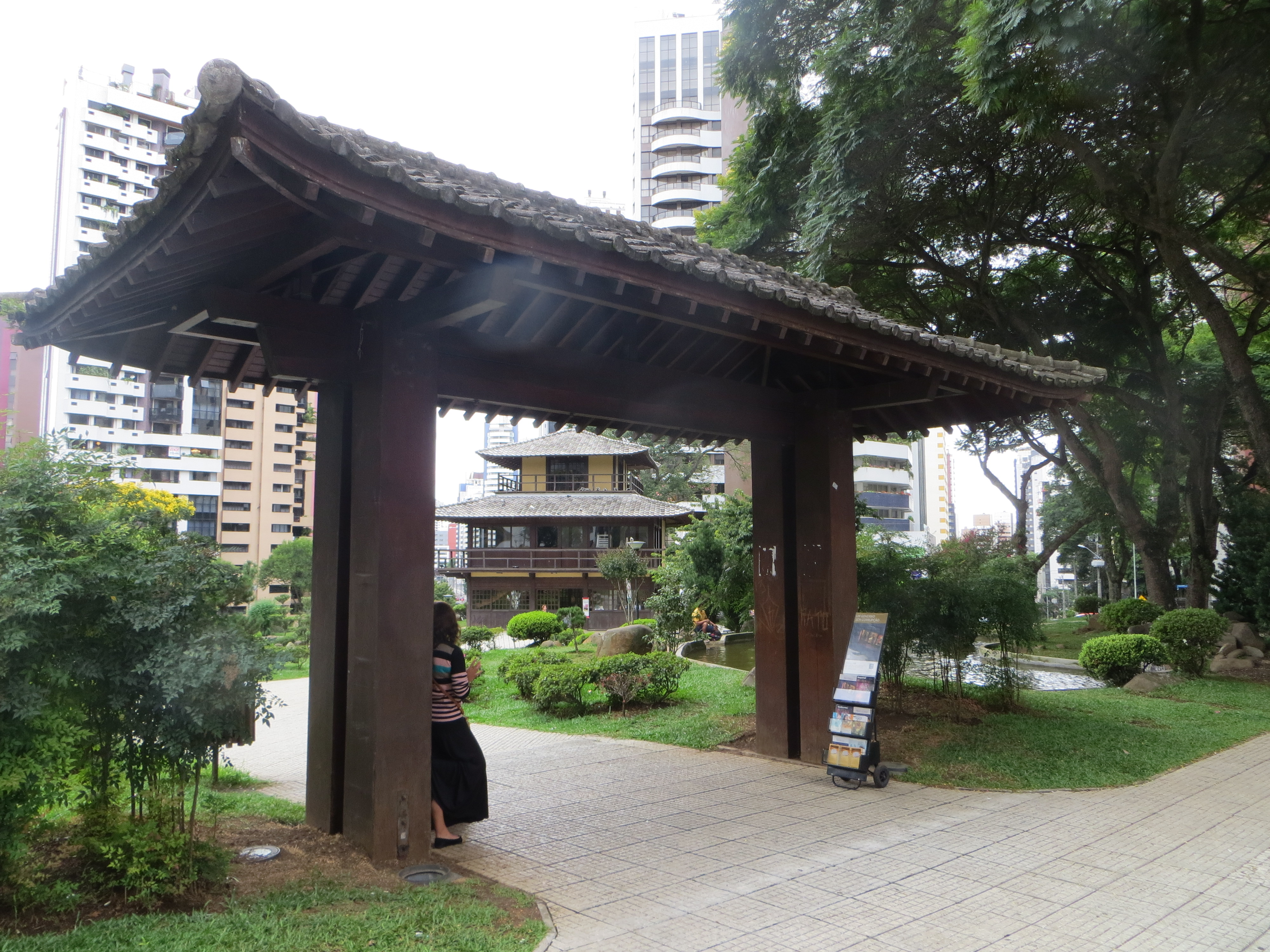
Japanese Portal

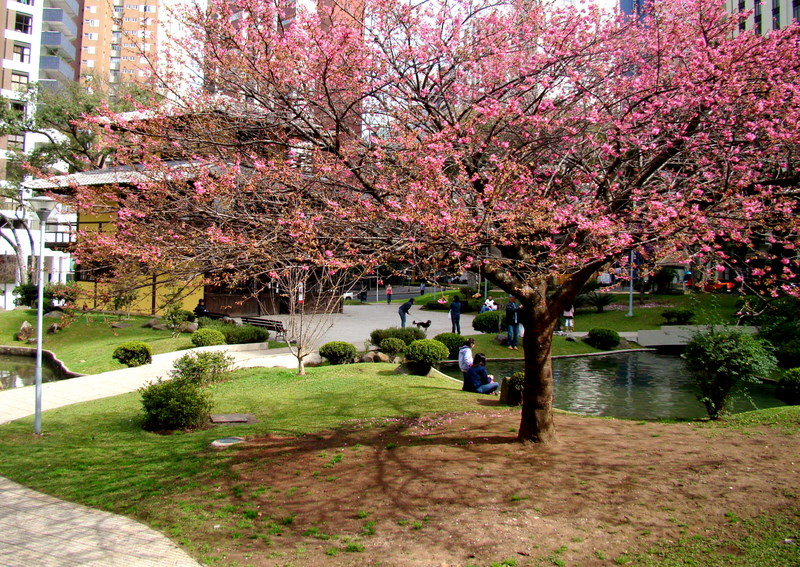
Cherry trees donated by the Japanese government

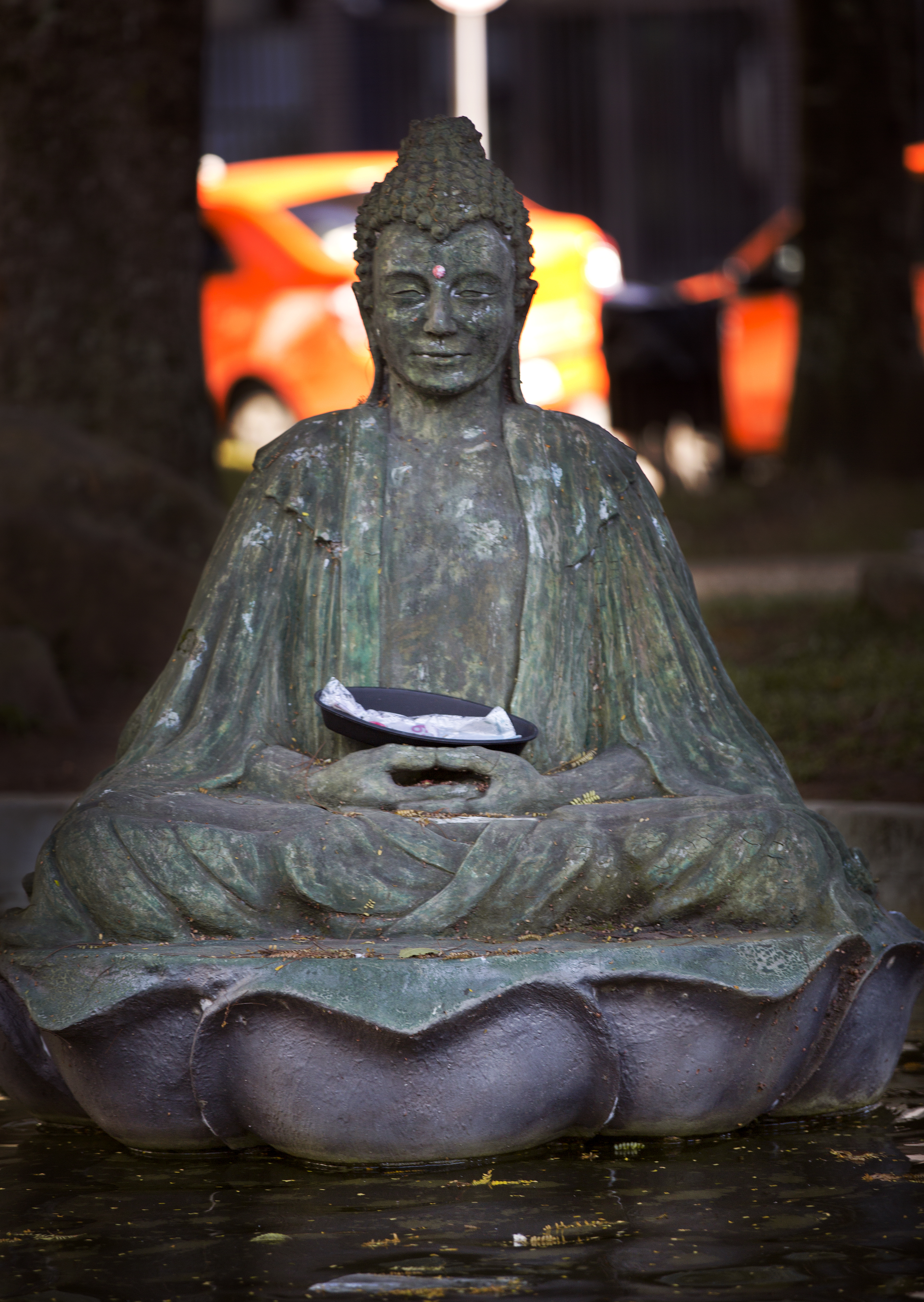
Buddha on a Lotus Flower sculpture
