= Arboretum Island =

Arboretum in Turkey

- Location within Istanbul
- Location: Ümraniye, Istanbul Province, Turkey
- Coordinates: 40°59′48″N 29°07′05″E
- Area: 32 ha (79 acres)
- Created: 2002
- Operator: TEMA Foundation

Arboretum Island (Turkish: Arboretum Adası), aka Nezahat Gökyiğit Botanical Garden (Turkish: Nezahat Gökyiğit Botanik Bahçesi), is an arboretum located in Ümraniye district Istanbul Province, Turkey.

Opened in 2002 to the public, it was named in honor of Nezhat Gökyiğit, spouse of Turkish businessman Nihat Gökyiğit. It contains about 50,000 plants in an area covering 32 ha (79 acres).
