= Aston Norwood Gardens =

Garden in New Zealand

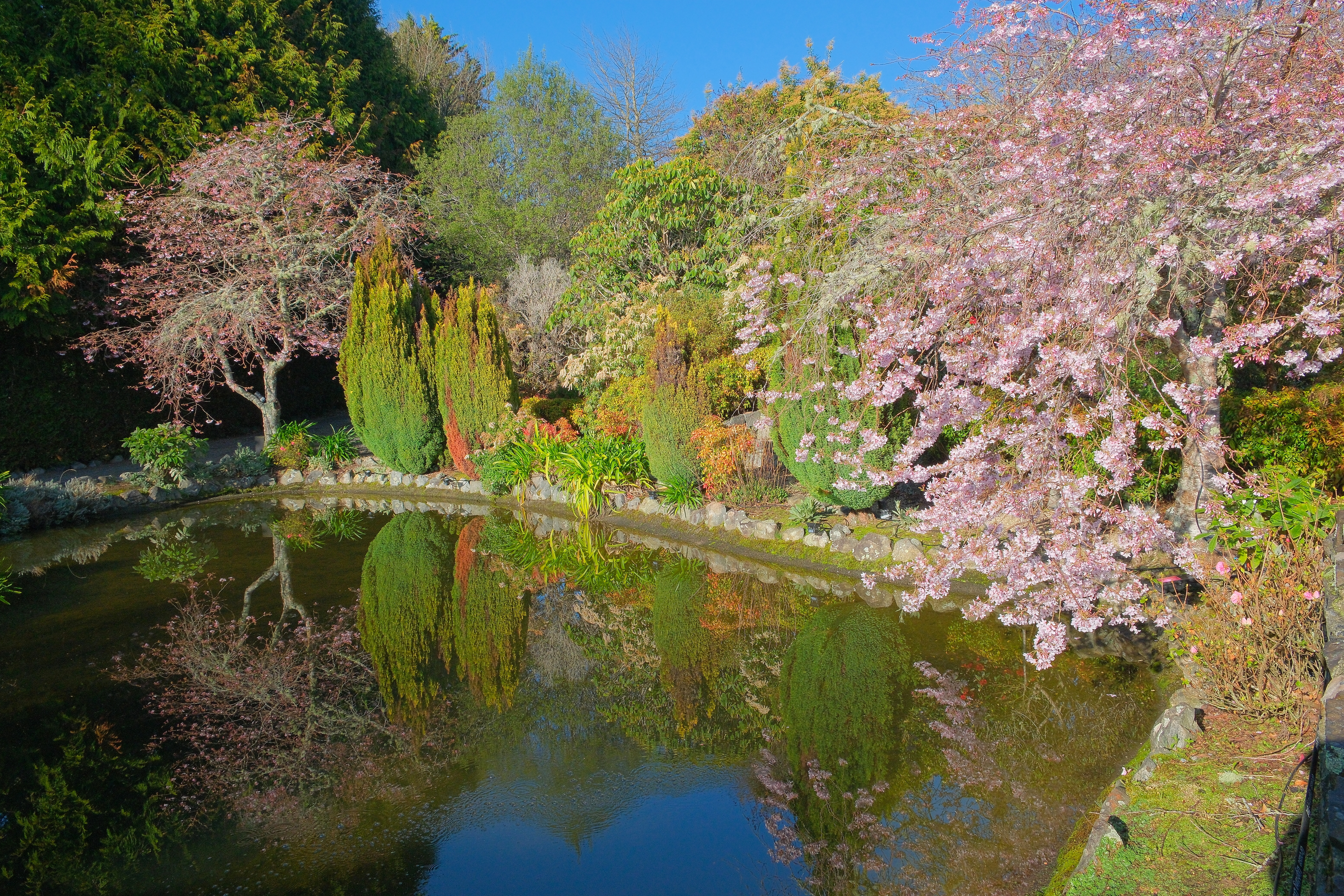
- Cherry blossom trees next to top pond
- Interactive map of Aston Norwood Gardens
- Location: Kaitoke, Upper Hutt City, New Zealand
- Coordinates: 41°04′53″S 175°12′24″E
- Established: 1990s
- Status: Open to visitors
- Website: Aston Norwood Gardens web site

Aston Norwood Gardens is a private garden and function centre/wedding venue north of Upper Hutt, New Zealand. It is accessible to the public for a fee and is most known for its cherry blossom trees.

The gardens encompass 14 acres (5.7 ha) of rolling terrain along Remutaka Stream and were created in the late 1990s, formerly known as the "Kaitoke Country Gardens". The area was transformed from bare paddocks with only a few trees to a mature garden with around 400 cherry blossom trees, rhododendrons, and other flowering plants, a garden maze and two ponds connected by a small waterfall. The loosely Japanese-inspired garden holds its annual "Blossom Valley festival" every spring when the cherry blossom trees are in flower, typically from mid September to early October. At that time of the year, the garden is also open in the evenings and lit up after dark, in particular the cherry blossom trees.

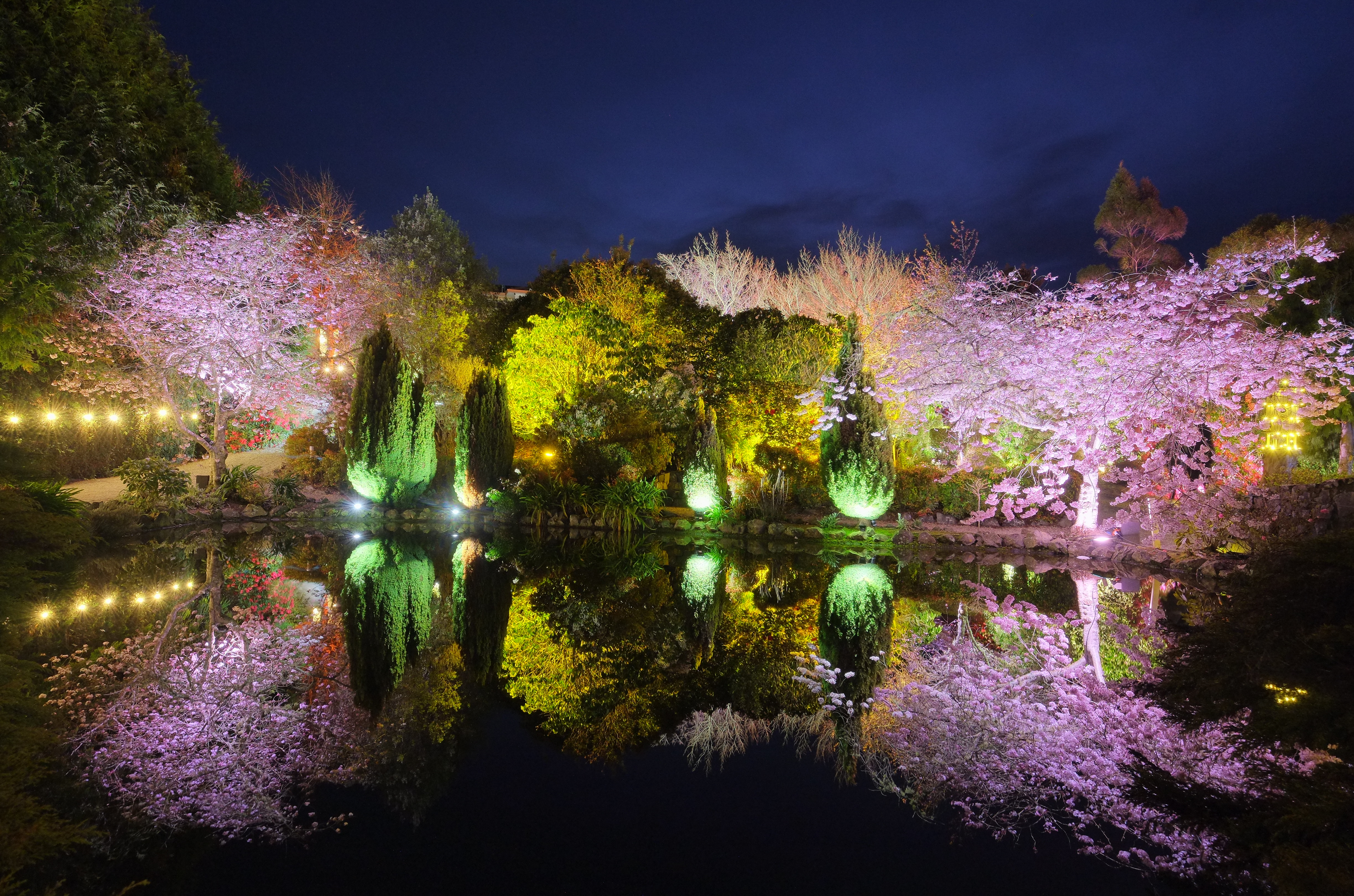
Garden lit up at night

Most of the cherry blossom trees are of the variety Prunus × yedoensis 'Awanui', a variant close to the iconic pink yoshino cherry tree, chosen because it was available in New Zealand.

Aston Norwood Gardens operates a function centre and wedding venue and also has a garden centre attached to it.
