= Japanese American Historical Plaza =

Public plaza in Portland, Oregon, U.S.

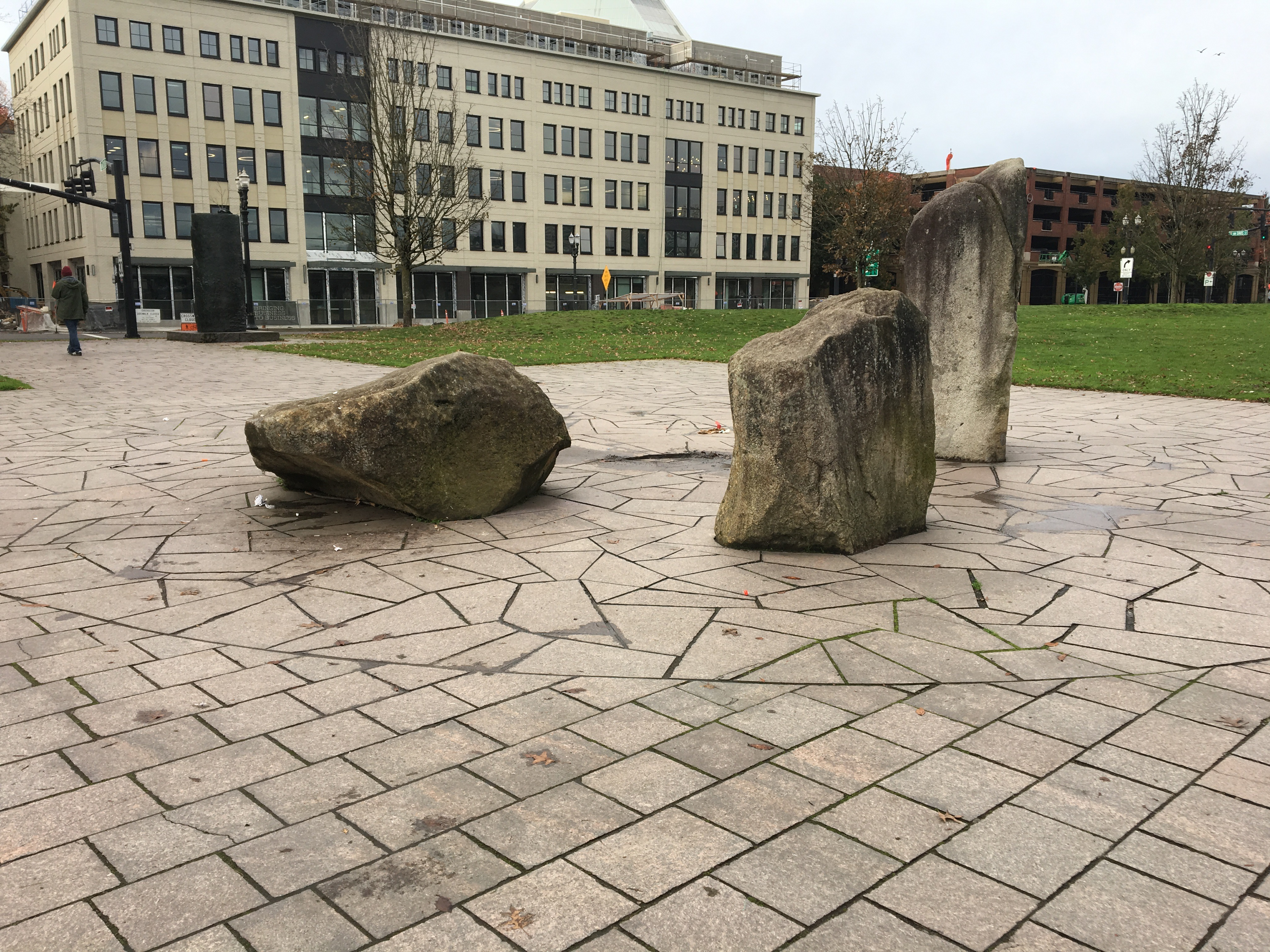
- The plaza in 2016
- Location: Portland, Oregon, U.S.
- Location within Portland, Oregon
- Coordinates: 45.5239°N 122.6697°W

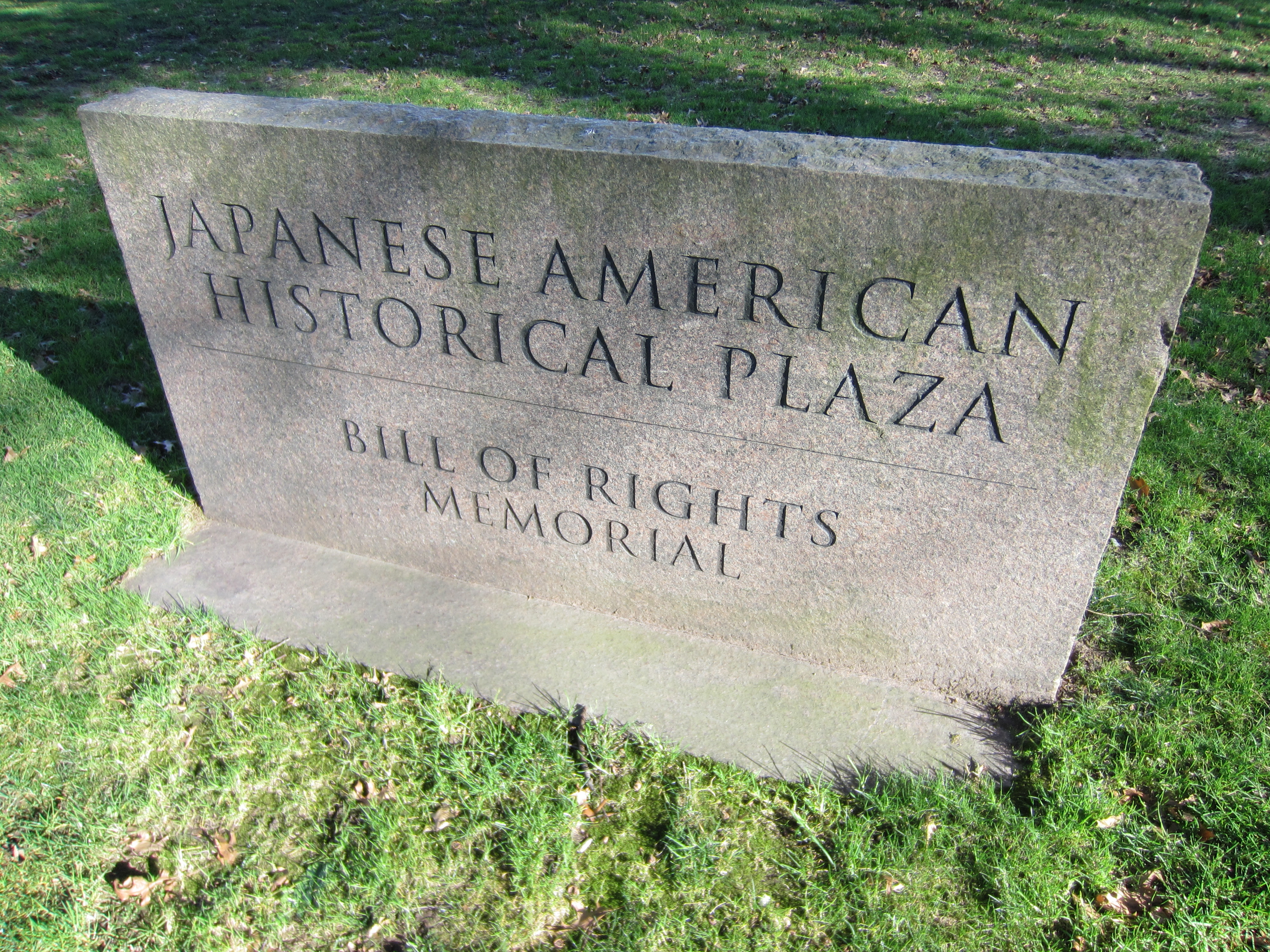
Signage, 2012

Japanese American Historical Plaza (Japanese: 日系アメリカ人歴史広場, Nikkei Amerikajin Rekishi Hiroba) is a plaza in Portland, Oregon's Tom McCall Waterfront Park, located where the Portland Japantown once stood.

== Description and history ==
The plaza extends northward from the Burnside Bridge along NW Naito Parkway and follows the flow of the Willamette River. The plan, sponsored by the Japanese American Citizens League with Bill Naito encouraging its proposal, was accepted in 1988.

Designed by landscape architect Robert Murase, the plaza tells the important history of the Japanese in Oregon. It illuminates the challenges faced by Japanese immigrant and the incarnations of people with Japanese ancestors. The plaza represents the poems of the experience of the Japanese immigrants and an important reminder of the U.S. Constitution and Bill of Rights.

The Oregon Nikkei Endowment administers the plaza, which features Songs of Innocence, Songs of Experience (1990), a bronze-and-stone sculpture by Jim Gion.

== See also ==
- Cherry blossoms in Portland, Oregon
- History of Japanese Americans in Portland, Oregon
