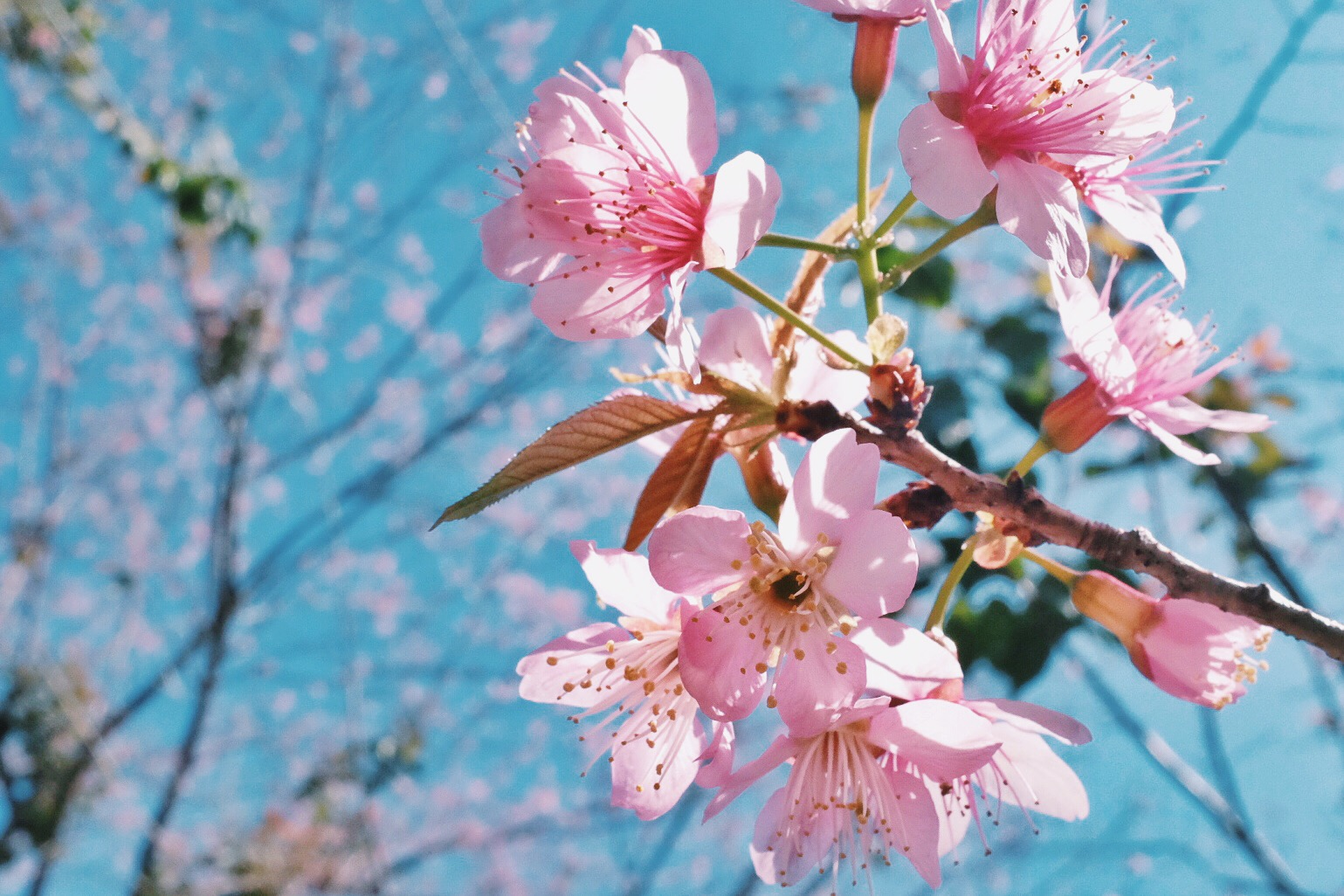
- Wild Himalayan cherry in Thailand.

Conservation status
- Least Concern (IUCN 3.1)

Scientific classification
- Kingdom: Plantae
- Clade: Embryophytes
- Clade: Tracheophytes
- Clade: Angiosperms
- Clade: Eudicots
- Clade: Rosids
- Order: Rosales
- Family: Rosaceae
- Genus: Prunus
- Subgenus: Prunus subg. Cerasus
- Species: P. cerasoides

Binomial name
- Prunus cerasoides Buch.-Ham. ex D.Don

Synonyms
- List: Cerasus cerasoides (Buch.-Ham. ex D. Don) S.Ya.Sokolov; Cerasus pectinata Spach; Cerasus phoshia Buch.-Ham. ex D.Don; Cerasus puddum Roxb. ex Ser.; Maddenia pedicellata Hook.f.; Microcerasus pectinata (Walp.) M.Roem.; Microcerasus phoshia (Buch.-Ham. ex D.Don) M.Roem.; Prunus carmesina H.Hara; Prunus hosseusii Diels; Prunus majestica Koehne; Prunus pectinata Walp.

= Prunus cerasoides =

Species of tree

Prunus cerasoides, commonly known as the wild Himalayan cherry, sour cherry or pahhiya is a species of deciduous cherry tree in the family Rosaceae.

Its range includes parts of East Asia, South Asia, and Southeast Asia. Its center of diversity lies in the Eastern Himalayas, which extends west into the Western Himalayas and south towards the tropical highlands of mainland Southeast Asia. In India the tree is widely revered in the Himalayan state of Uttarakhand. The tree is found in temperate forest from 1,200 to 2,400 metres (4,000 to 8,000 ft) in elevation and extends to tropical highlands of Southeast Asia.

== Description ==
Prunus cerasoides is a tree which grows up to 30 m (100 ft) in height. It has glossy, ringed bark. When the tree is not in flower, it is characterised by glossy, ringed bark and long, dentate stipules.

The tree flowers twice a year, during autumn and spring. First flowering blooms between the months of January to April and second flowering blooms between September and November. Flowers are hermaphroditic and are pinkish white in color. It has ovoid yellow fruit that turns red as it ripens.

== Distribution ==
Prunus cerasoides is native to south-western China, Myanmar, northern Thailand, Laos, extending westward towards the Himalayas in India, Nepal in both temperate zones and tropical highlands. The species is not native to areas further west of India, where other Prunus species begin to dominate.

A 2022 study on implications for planning forest restoration in tropical and subtropical Asia noted Prunus cerasoides as one of the four suitable trees for forest restoration in both island and mainland Southeast Asia.

== Cultivation ==
Prunus cerasoides thrives in well-drained and moisture-retentive loamy soil, in an open, sunny, and sheltered location.

P. cerasoides, like most members of the genus Prunus, is shallow rooted and is likely to produce suckers if the root is damaged. It is likely to become chlorotic if too much lime is present. It is known to be susceptible to honey fungus.

The seed requires two to three months cold stratification and is best sown in a cold frame as early in winter as possible. The seed grows rather slowly and can sometimes take about 18 months to germinate depending on the conditions.

== Culture ==
In India, Prunus cerasoides is known in Hindi as padam, pajja, pahhiya or padmakashtha has cultural and religious significance. Among Hindus in Himachal Pradesh and Uttarakhand, it is considered sacred and associated with Vishnu and Shiva. During Maha Shivaratri, the leaves are used to make a wreath with wild citrus fruits, which is hung at the prayer altar. They are also seen in Kodaikanal in south India.

In Hindi and Sanskrit it is known as padma, padmakh, pajja, pahhiya, padmakashtha, charu, hima, kaidra, padmagandi. In Nepali it is known as paiyu. In Khasi and Mizo languages it is known as dieng kaditusoo and tlaizawng.

Prunus cerasoides cherry blossom festivals are held in India during the months of October–November. Shillong is notable for its annual prunus cerasoides cherry blossom festival held during the month of November.

Religious Significance in Uttarakhand

The tree is referred to as "पंय्यां" in the Himalayan State of Uttarakhand, India, and is regarded as a holy tree by various groups in both the Garhwal and Kumaon region. The tree is also worshipped exclusively by shilpkars or doms in certain regions of the state.

Cerasoides is among the few trees in the region that remain blooming at the height of winters during, December and January and hence is worshipped for its resilience. The tree is traditionally never chopped down in Uttarakhand because of it religious significance, only branches can be cut if there arises a requirement of its leaves, flowers or wood.

The Cerasoides is regarded as the tree of the gods in Uttarakhand. Acharya Manu notes "when all the trees drop their leaves during the harsh winter season, flowers grow in the leaves of the tree." The use of its wood in the wedding hall symbolizes strength and happiness in the new life of the bride and groom.

Its stalk is also used one way or another in Yajnopaveet, Jagar and Baisi. Among the instruments played in religious programs, Lukudi made of wood of Paiyan tree is considered to be the most sacred. Apart from this, the garlands used in homes during the house warming yajns, yagyopaveet etc. are also made from paiyan leaves.

The leaves are also used as incense. Village weddings are considered incomplete without having been decorated with the branches and leaves from the tree. Among the instruments played in religious ceremonies, lukudi made from the wood of pahhiya tree is considered to be the most sacred.

== Uses ==
=== Food ===
- Fruit — 15mm in diameter, the fruit can be eaten raw or cooked.
- Gum — Gum is chewed and obtained from the trunk. It can be employed as a substitute for gum tragacanth.
- Seed — It can be eaten raw or cooked.

=== Other uses ===
The fruits and the leaves give a dark green dye. Seeds can be used in the manufacture of necklaces.

The wood is hard, strong, durable and aromatic, and branches are used as walking sticks.
