= Japanese community of Mexico City =

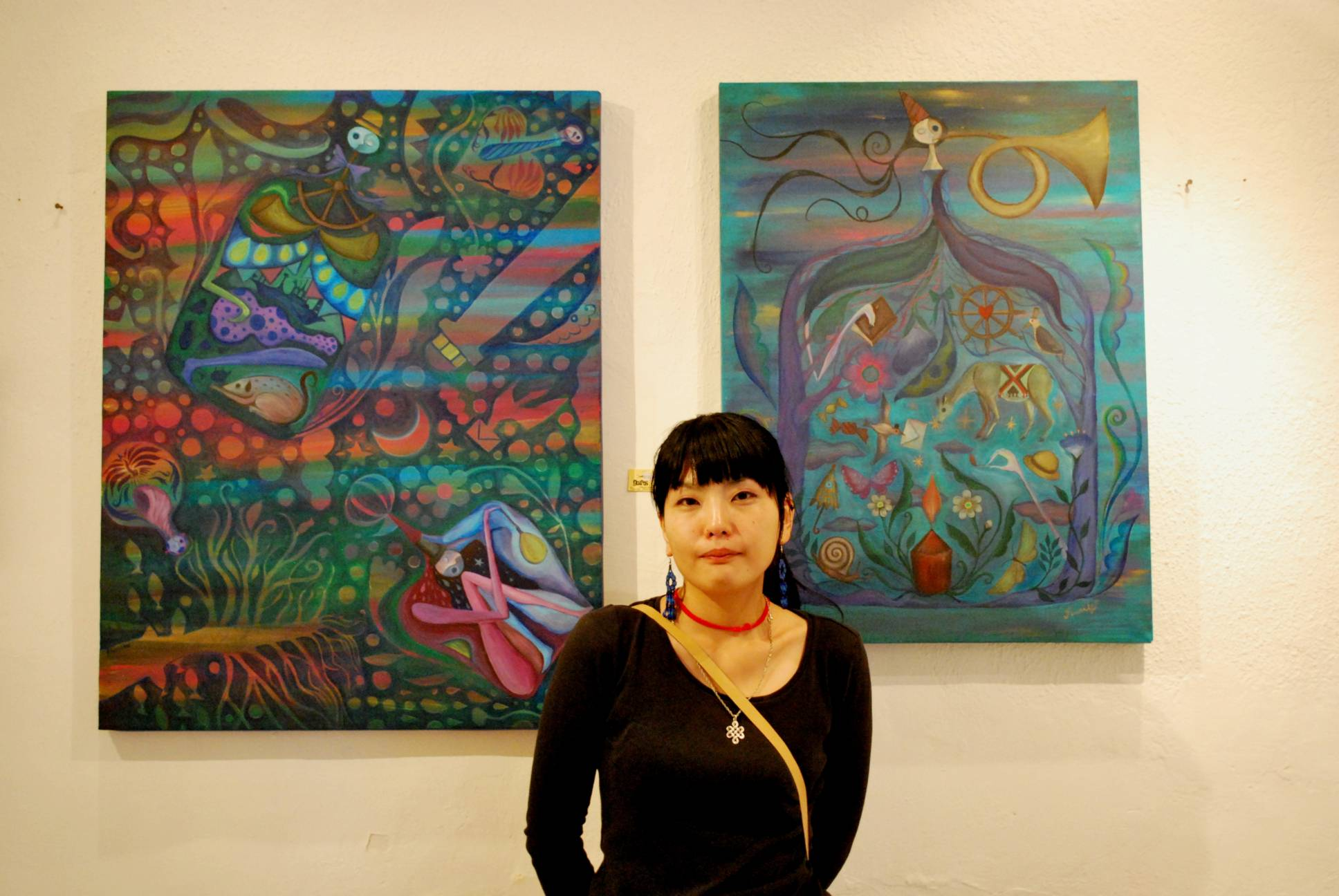
Japanese artist Fumiko Nakashima with two of her works at the Garros Galería in Mexico City

Mexico City has a community of Japanese Mexican people and Japanese expatriates that is dispersed throughout the city. Many Japanese persons had moved to Mexico City in the 1940s due to wartime demands made by the Mexican government. Multiple Japanese-Mexican associations, the Japanese embassy, the Liceo Mexicano Japonés, and other educational institutions serve the community. The residents are educated through the LMJ, the part-time school Chuo Gakuen, and the adult school Instituto Cultural Mexicano-Japonés.

== History ==
In 1936 there were about 602 Japanese nationals living in Mexico City. By 1939 there were 967 Japanese persons, mostly owners of businesses, grouped into 295 families resident in the Mexico City area.

After the December 1941 bombing of Pearl Harbor in the United States the Mexican government severed relations with the Japanese government and ordered the closure of all existing Japanese organizations; at the time Mexico City had the Japanese Association of Mexico City.

In 1941 the Mexican government began forcing Japanese from a zone in northern Mexico near the U.S. border and along the Pacific Ocean to move out. They were permitted to move to Guadalajara or Mexico City, so the Mexican government could more easily control them and engage in surveillance. The Mexican government required all Japanese immigrants to move to either Guadalajara or Mexico City after it declared war against Japan in 1942, and relocation began in January of that year. Most Japanese moved to Mexico City instead of Guadalajara because there was a pre-existing Japanese community. According to Nihon-jin mekishiko ijūshi (日本人メキシコ移住史; "The History of the Japanese Immigrants in Mexico") by Minoru Izawa, about 80% of the relocated Japanese, with Baja California supplying the largest number of them, settled in Mexico City. There were no organizations or people who made an exact count of the internal migration, and Jerry García, author of Looking Like the Enemy: Japanese Mexicans, the Mexican State, and US Hegemony, 1897-1945, concluded that trying to determine the exact number of Japanese who settled Mexico City is "difficult".

By March 1942, about 4,000 ethnic Japanese were located in Mexico City. Stephen R. Niblo, author of Mexico in the 1940s: Modernity, Politics, and Corruption, stated that the decision to ask persons of Japanese descent to move to Mexico City "probably" shielded them from harm, and Mexican government officials of the era felt sympathetic towards persons of Japanese descent.

Japanese were allowed to have any type of employment and the government allowed the establishment of a Japanese-language school in Mexico City. They had been forbidden from having meetings with over 10 persons and from traveling during the night since 1941. The Japanese community in Mexico City housed new arrivals in a large building that they got permission to use, and they formed their own mutual aid committee, the Comité Japonés de Ayuda Mutua (CJAM; "Japanese Committee of Mutual Aid"). The CJAM was founded by March 4, 1942, the day a circular announced the foundation of the organization. The CJAM, the sole official Japanese organization in Mexico during World War II, originally located at No. 112 Sor Juana Inez de la Cruz, funded by 230,000 pesos collected from property sales, including the property sold by the defunct Japanese Association of Mexico City, and donations. Ethnic Japanese originating from various states who were formerly leaders in other Japanese associations became the leaders of the new CJAM. The CJAM later moved to No. 327 Calle de Antonio Abad. The CJAM had difficulty getting financing due to the Mexican government's December 10, 1941 freeze of Japanese assets, and throughout the war U.S. intelligence agencies suspected that the CJAM was a Japanese intelligence asset. In the 1940s the CJAM obtained a hacienda on 200 hectares (490 acres) of land in Temixco from Alejandro Lacy so it could house newly-arriving Japanese coming from other parts of Mexico.

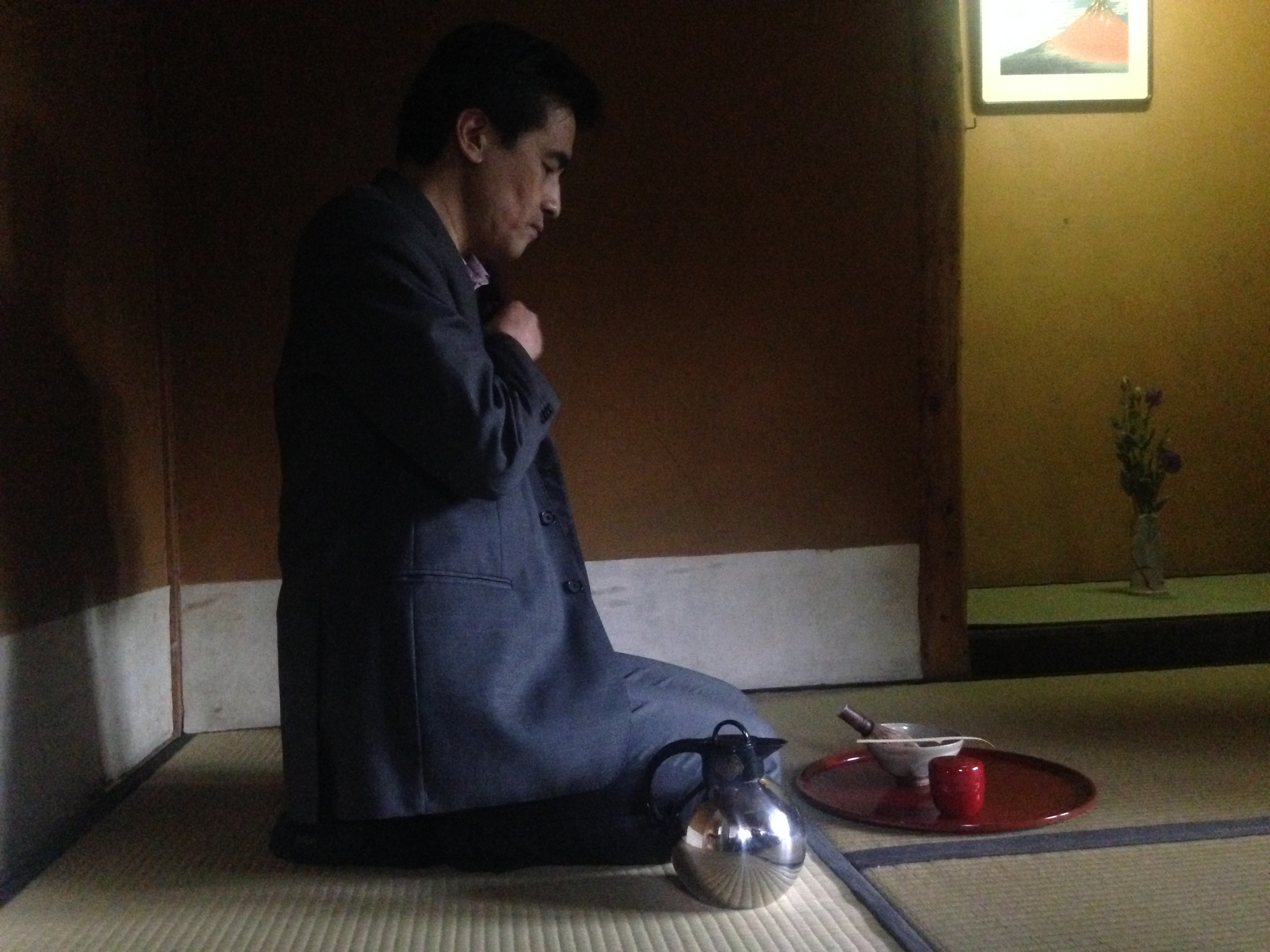
Japanese tea ceremony in Mexico City

Officially the Japanese were allowed to leave Guadalajara and Mexico City in 1945 but many had left earlier than that to go to their prewar communities. Most ethnic Japanese in Mexico in the postwar era remained in Mexico City and Guadalajara. Daniel M. Masterson, author of The Japanese in Latin America, wrote that many of the Issei stayed after the war ended because they became used to contact with the Japanese community and that many Issei were too old to restart their lives on the former seized lands. Masterson wrote that many Nisei stayed because Mexico City had schools catering to Japanese people which reinforced Japanese culture in Sansei and younger Nisei.

== Geographical distribution ==
Since the post-World War II era there has been no specific "Japantown" in Mexico City. Japanese people live in many places in the Mexico City area.

== Institutions ==
=== Asociación México Japonesa ===
The Asociación México Japonesa A.C. ("Mexican Japanese Association"), called the Nichiboku Kyōkai (日墨協会) in Japanese, hosts Japanese diplomats and dignitaries, organizes cultural and sporting events, and promotes positive international relations between the governments of Japan and Mexico. The events organized by the association include baseball games and sumo matches. It assisted the Embassy of Japan in Mexico in gathering census information on the Mexican Japanese population.

It was formed by the 1961 merger of a Japanese association for Japanese who had moved to Mexico City in World War II and one for Japanese who had already lived in Mexico City during World War II. As of 1983, there were over 500 Japanese families on its membership roster.

The Asociación México Japonesa owns a cultural center, the Nichiboku Bunka Kaikan (日墨文化会館 "Mexican Japanese Cultural Center"), located on land with 4.5 acres (1.8 ha) of space, within the Las Águilas colonia of the Álvaro Obregón borough. The building has three stories and houses a 500 person banquet hall, meeting rooms, a Japanese restaurant, and offices. The premises also include athletic facilities and playgrounds for children. The parking lot has space for 150 vehicles. The athletic facilities include baseball, soccer, tennis, and volleyball facilities. After Mexican government released assets that it had seized from Japan during World War II, the Japanese government donated the funds to have the cultural center built. Daniel M. Masterson, author of The Japanese in Latin America, wrote that the cultural center serves as a "home away from home" for elderly Issei living in Mexico.

A board with 42 members and 13 committees and an elected president control the association. As of 1983, the association's main source of operational funds was profits of the on-site restaurant, which made $20,000 U.S. ($64650.85 according to inflation) monthly as of that year.

=== Diplomatic missions ===
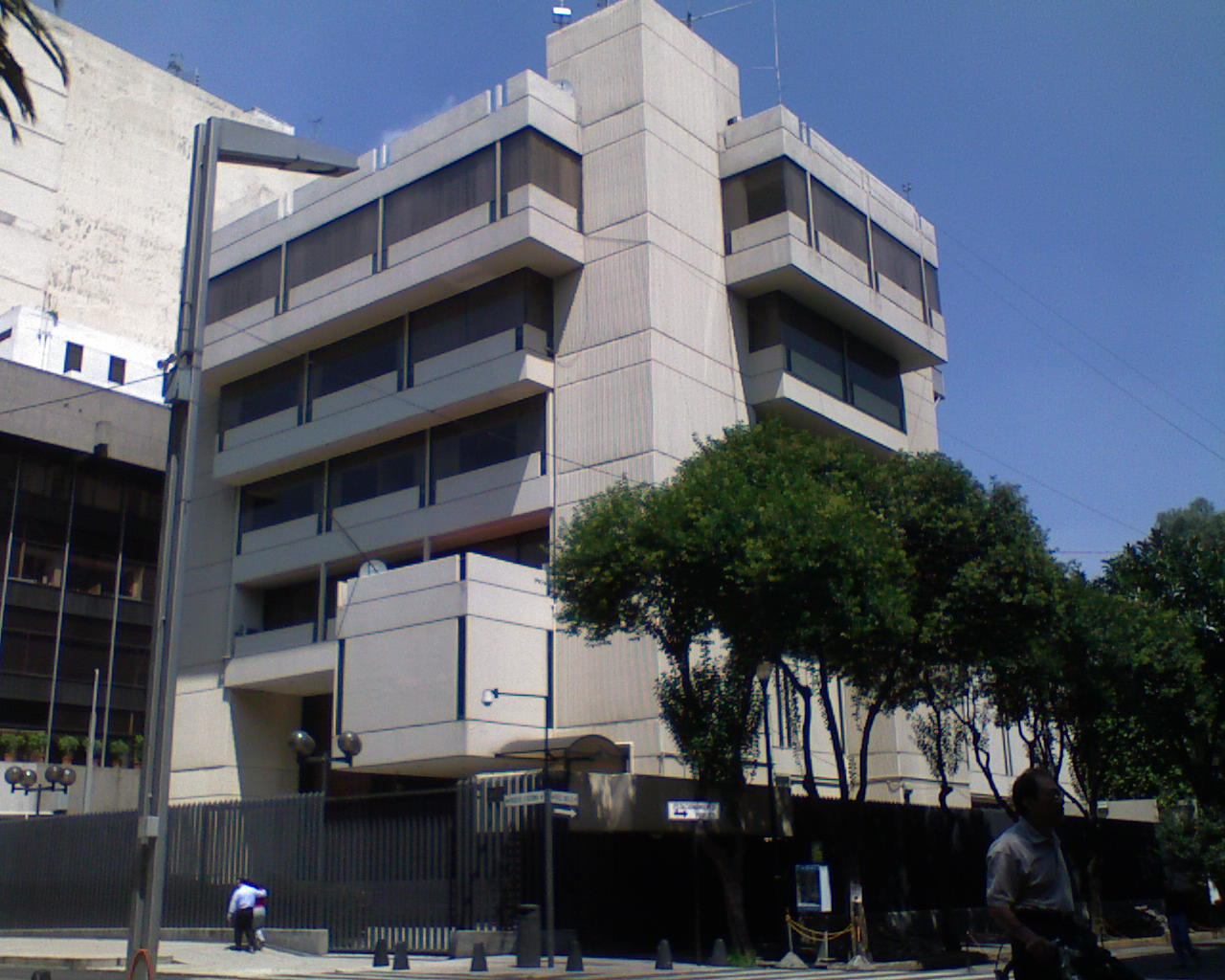
Embassy of Japan in Mexico

The Japanese government operates an embassy in Mexico City.

=== Voluntary associations ===
As of 1983 there were several voluntary associations for the Issei, Nisei, and Sansei. Chizuko Watanabe Hougen (千鶴子 ホーゲン・渡邊), the author of the master's thesis "The Japanese Immigrant Community in Mexico Its History and Present" at the California State University, Los Angeles, stated that the Sansei "are more active in getting together" while using one blanket organization while the Issei have more associations.

The kenjin-kai (県人会 "prefectural associations") had memberships depending on the prefectures of origin. The meishin-kai (明申会 "Year of the Monkey Club") was founded by people born in 1908, which according to the Chinese zodiac is the year of the Monkey, and by 1983 anyone born in the Meiji era was eligible to join. The Bokuto Sogo Fujo-kai ("Association for Mutual Aid") opened in 1949 and by 1983 had about 76 members. The Nisei-kai (二世会) is the Nisei association. The Nisei also operate a mutual financing club known as the Nisei Mujin-kai (二世無尽会 "Mutual Loan Club"). The Grupo Sansei ("Sansei Group") is the Sansei association, known by its Spanish name instead of by a Japanese name.

The Kokusui Doshi-kai ("Ultra-Nationalist Comrades Association") was established by Japanese who celebrated a Japanese victory in World War II and did not accept Japan's loss in the war, and originally had 352 members. By 1983, the organization consisted of three surviving original members and some Nisei. Watanabe stated that by 1983 the community had "almost[...]forgotten" the existence of that association.

=== Hobby groups ===
As of 1983 there were several Nikkei hobby groups serving the Nikkei. Buddhist branches have churches in Mexico. The Azteca League organizes baseball games with Nikkei players. Activities by groups include tea ceremony, Haiku, dance, shigin, and golf tournaments.

== Education ==
The Liceo Mexicano Japonés ("Japanese Mexican Lyceum") is located in the Pedregal neighborhood of the Álvaro Obregón borough in southern Mexico City. Over one decade of organizational activity occurred before the school's opening. The merger process forming the school began in 1974, and the school opened in September 1977.

In the 1940s the CJAM established a school for Japanese children in Mexico City. Prior to the formation of the LMJ there was a preparatory school for Japanese and five schools operated by Mexican Nikkei. As part of the merger, the preparatory school, and three of Mexico City's four part-time Japanese schools were combined.

Chuo Gakuen, A.C. was founded in 1944. The LMJ did not absorb Chuo Gakuen, which as of 1983 had 70 students and gave after-school lessons to students attending Mexican schools. It is located in the Cuauhtémoc district.

Instituto Cultural Mexicano-Japonés A.C. (ICMJ), operated by the Nisei-kai, provides courses in the Japanese language and culture to adults. It is located in Coyoacán.

== Transportation ==
In 2006 Aeroméxico began flights from Mexico City International Airport to Narita International Airport, near Tokyo, via Tijuana International Airport. By 2016 the services were converted to nonstop ones due to the use of the Boeing 787.

On February 15, 2017 All Nippon Airways was scheduled to begin flights from Narita to Mexico City.

Previously Japan Airlines flew from Narita to Mexico City via Vancouver International Airport. Japan Airlines ended these flights in 2010.

== Notable residents ==
- Carlos Kasuga (businessperson)
- Issa Lish (fashion model)
- Fumiko Nakashima (artist)
- Úrsula Murayama (actress)
- Hiromi Hayakawa (singer, actress and voice actress)
- Kingo Nonaka - During and after World War II
- Yoshio

== See also ==
- Japanese immigration to Mexico

== Bibliography ==
- Kashima, Tetsuden. Judgment Without Trial: Japanese American Imprisonment During World War II (The Scott and Laurie Oki series in Asian American studies). University of Washington Press, November 1, 2011. ISBN 0295802332, 9780295802336.
- Masterson, Daniel M. The Japanese in Latin America. University of Illinois Press, 2004. 0252071441, 9780252071447.
- Watanabe, Chizuko. "The Japanese Immigrant Community in Mexico Its History and Present" (Master's thesis), California State University at Los Angeles, 1983.
