= Carlos Kasuga =

Mexican businessman

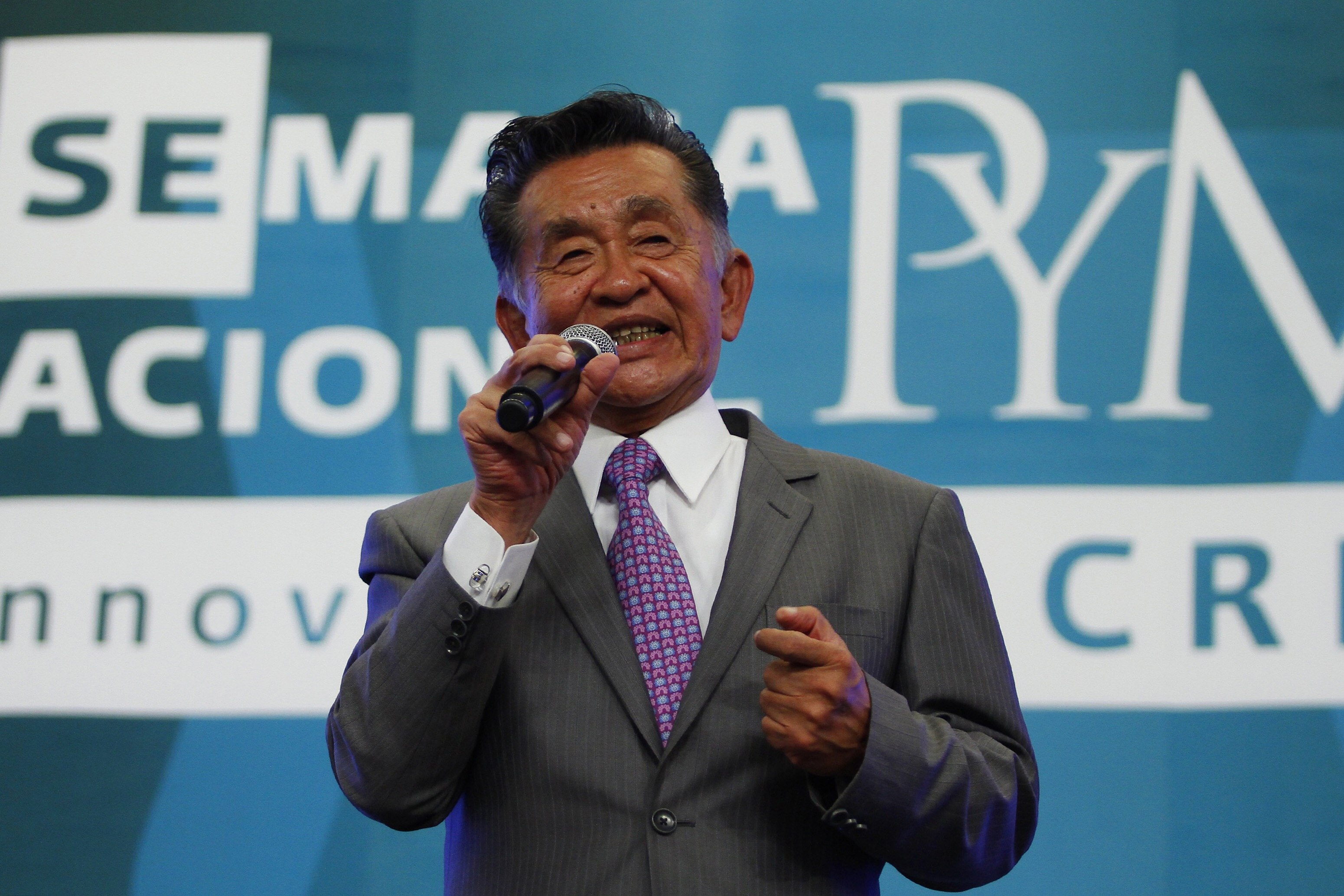
- Carlos Kasuga during a conference at the Semana PyME 2011 sponsored by the Secretaría de Economía.
- Born: Carlos Kasuga Osaka; 26 October 1937 (age 88); Cerritos, San Luis Potosí, Mexico
- Education: Escuela Bancaria y Comercial
- Occupation: Director of Yakult (Mexican division)

Carlos Kasuga Osaka (born 26 October 1937) is a Mexican businessman, philanthropist and public speaker. He is the founder of the Mexican division of the yogurt company Yakult, and he served as its director. He also founded the Liceo Mexicano Japonés and served as its chair. He also served as the president of the Pan American Nikkei Association (PANA, Asociación Panamericana Nikkei, APN), having done so since the 1981 establishment of the organization until 1995.

== Early life ==
His parents were immigrants from Japan. His father, Tsutomu Kasuga, emigrated from Nagano Prefecture in 1930 as a result of the Great Depression. His mother, Mitsuko Osaka, arrived in 1936 after Tsutomu asked his relatives in Japan to find a potential wife willing to move to Mexico. The couple originally lived in Cerritos, San Luis Potosí, where Carlos Kasuga Osaka was born in 1937.

In September 1938, the Kasuga family opened a general merchant store in Cárdenas, San Luis Potosi named Carlos Kasuga.

Kasuga stated that in 1942, amid tensions caused by World War II, when he was around four years old, soldiers came to his house and told his family they had to leave for Mexico City in 72 hours. He stated that later two soldiers came to the house to escort the family to the train station and that everyone in Cerritos came to the station to say goodbye to the Kasugas.

The Kasuga family became part of the Japanese community of Mexico City and they opened a candy shop with the Yamazaki family after the war.

Carlos Kasuga earned a degree in accounting from the Escuela Bancaria y Comercial. In 1956, Kasuga studied at the Sophia University in Tokyo.

== Career ==
During his time at Sophia University, he learned about new plastics being used in Japan's toy industry. This knowledge led to the establishment of Industrias Kay by the Kasuga family, a business that would become the main manufacturer of inflatable toys in Mexico.

== Philanthropy ==
Kasuga, along with other Nikkei, has helped promote Japanese attitudes to cleanliness and education in Acacoyagua, Chiapas, the site of the first organized Japanese settlement in Latin America. As a result of his involvement, the municipality decreased its daily production of trash from 18 tons to 5. Kasuga has donated the funds for smart boards and computers at local schools.

== See also ==
- Japanese community of Mexico City
