= Tatsugoro Matsumoto =

Matsumoto brought Jacarandas to Mexico

- 松本辰五郎
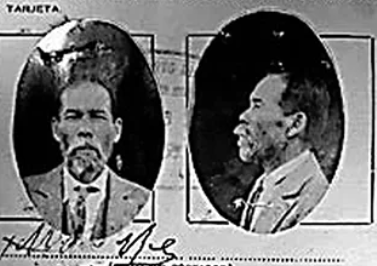
- Born: 1861; Tokyo
- Died: 1955 (aged 93–94); Mexico
- Occupations: Landscape Architect; Businessman

Tatsugorō Matsumoto (松本辰五郎, 1861–1955) was a Japanese landscape architect and businessman primarily known for his work in the Americas, specifically Peru and Mexico. His designs in Mexico City led to the large amount of Jacaranda trees that are present in the city. Matsumoto and his son Sanshiro were prominent amongst the early Japanese community in Mexico, and helped intercede when the community was persecuted during World War II.

== Life and work ==
Tatsugoro Matsumoto was born in Tokyo in 1861. He worked as a landscape architect for the imperial palace in Japan. In 1888, Matsumoto moved to Peru to design a Japanese garden for German businessman Oscar Herren. The garden was on the grounds of the Quinta Herren, a mansion in Lima that became the location of several embassies throughout the 20th century. Mexican rancher and mine owner, José Landero y Coss, was impressed by Matsumoto's work on the Quinta Herren. Landero commissioned Matsumoto to design and construct a garden on his ranch near the city of Pachuca. After completing this commission, Matsumoto briefly sojourned in the United States, and worked on the Japanese garden built in Golden Gate Park as part of the 1894 World's Fair in San Francisco.

In 1896, Matsumoto permanently emigrated to Mexico. In 1900, Porfirio Díaz and his wife, Carmen Romero Rubio hired Matsumoto to design floral arrangements for the interior and exterior of the presidential residence at Chapultepec Castle. In 1910, Matsumoto and his son, Sanshiro Matsumoto opened a garden emporium. By the 1930s the Matsumotos owned over ten large nurseries in Mexico City and employed over 200 Mexican employees. During the presidency of Pascual Ortiz Rubio, Matsumoto advocated for jacaranda trees be planted along Mexico City's main avenues. Rubio had wanted cherry trees to be planted, similar to the cherry trees in Washington D.C., but they were not fit for the climate of Mexico City. Instead, Matsumoto suggested the Brazilian Jacaranda, which was much more suited to the environment.

Matsumoto and his son became leaders of the Japanese diaspora in Mexico and negotiated on behalf of the community during World War II after the government of Mexico ordered all Japanese in the country to relocate to Mexico City and Guadalajara. They were involved in the founding of the Comité Japonés de Ayuda Mutua (CJAM; "Japanese Committee of Mutual Aid") and housed displaced Japanese Mexicans at their Hacienda de Batán. Before the war, Matsumoto had purchased Batán for the production of flowers. At one point during the war, Batán housed nearly 900 Japanese. Residents of the hacienda eventually were transferred to Temixco, Castro Urdiales, and Mexico City.

The economist Ian Goldin cites Matsumoto as an example of Meiji-era Japanese migration to the Americas, in response to joblessness, in his book The Shortest History of Migration.

Matsumoto died in 1955 at age 94.
