= Honouliuli National Historic Site =

Former internment camp near Waipahu, Hawaii

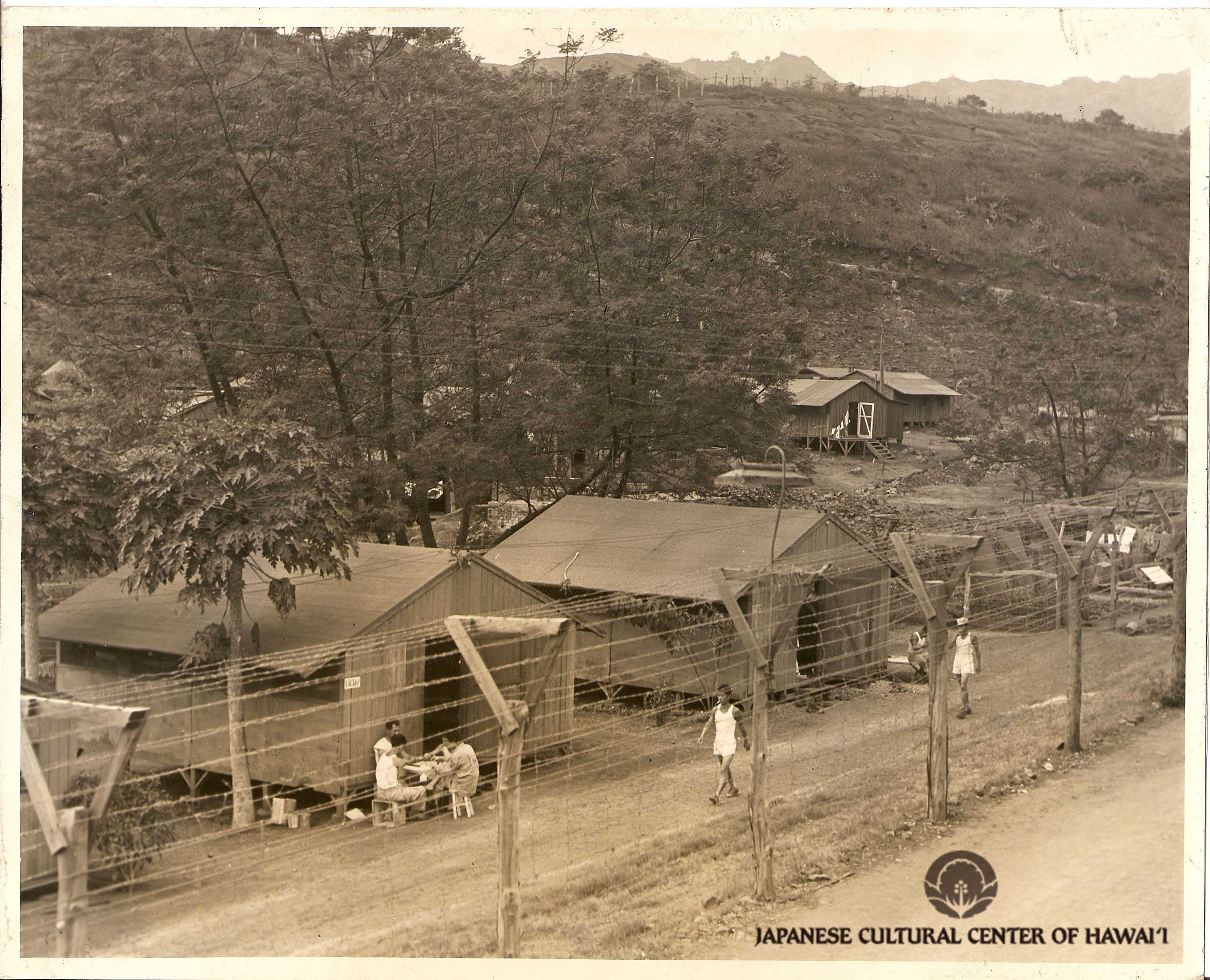

- Location within Hawaii
- 21°23′30″N 158°3′35″W

History
- Built: 1943

Site notes
- Area: 122.5 acres (49.6 ha)
- Governing body: National Park Service
- Website: Honouliuli National Historic Site

U.S. National Historic Site
- Official name: Honouliuli National Historical Site
- Designated: February 19, 2015

U.S. National Register of Historic Places
- Official name: Honouliuli Internment Camp
- Designated: February 21, 2012
- Reference no.: 09000855

Honouliuli National Historic Site is near Waipahu on the island of Oahu, in the U.S. state of Hawaii; it is the location of the Honouliuli Internment Camp, Hawaiʻi's largest and longest-operating Japanese internment camp, which opened in 1943 and closed in 1946. The site was designated a national monument on February 24, 2015, by President Barack Obama. The John D. Dingell Jr. Conservation, Management, and Recreation Act, signed March 12, 2019, redesignated it as Honouliui National Historic Site.

The internment camp held 320 internees. In Hawaii, where more than 150,000 Japanese Americans comprised more than one-third of the territory's population, only 1,200 to 1,800 were incarcerated. The site also became the largest prisoner of war camp in Hawaiʻi with nearly 4,000 individuals being held. Of the seventeen sites that were associated with the history of internment in Hawaiʻi during World War II, the camp was the only one built specifically for prolonged detention.

As of 2015, the national monument is without formal services and programs.

== Construction and operation ==
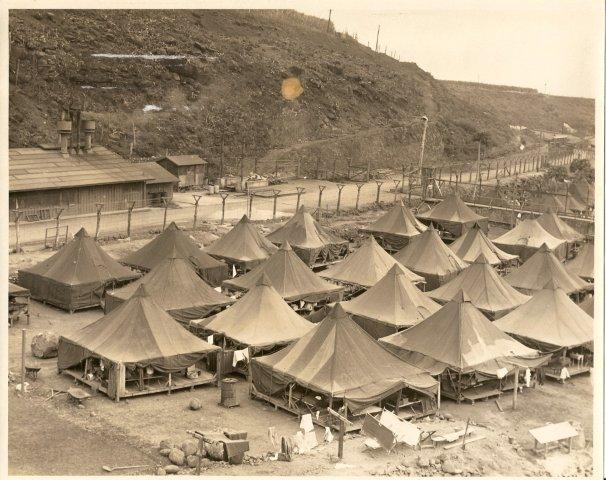
Honouliuli Internment Camp, 1940s

The camp was constructed on 160 acres (0.65 km^{2}) of land near Ewa and Waipahu on the island of Oahu to hold internees transferred from the soon-to-close Sand Island camp. It opened in March 1943. An 8-foot (2.4 m) dual barbed-wire fence enclosed the camp, and a company of military police stood guard from its eight watchtowers. Run by the U.S. Army, the camp's supervisor was Captain Siegfried Spillner. The isolated location in a deep gulch led Japanese American internees to nickname it jigoku dani (地獄谷; "hell valley"). Of the seventeen sites that were associated with the history of internment in Hawaiʻi during World War II, the camp was the only one built specifically for prolonged detention.

The camp was designed to hold 3,000 people. At one time it held 320 U.S. civilians. It was divided by barbed wire into sections, intended to separate internees by gender, nationality, and military or civilian status. By August 1943, there were 160 Japanese Americans and 69 Japanese interned there, according to the report of a colonel from the Swedish Legation who inspected the camp under the Geneva Convention.

Eventually, the camp held more than 4,000 Okinawans, Italians, German Americans, Koreans, and Taiwanese as well. The first Korean prisoners were believed to have arrived in late 1943 or early 1944; they comprised non-combatant laborers captured during the Gilbert and Marshall Islands campaign. A Korean-language newsletter, the Free Press for Liberated Korea (자유한인보), was written and mimeographed by three Korean soldiers of the Japanese Imperial Army interned in the camp; it continued publication until December 1945. Beginning in 1943, the Japanese American internees were either released on parole or transferred to Department of Justice camps on the mainland. After the third transfer in November 1944, twenty-one U.S. civilians remained in Honouliuli and the camp served primarily as a holding center for POWs. At the end of the war, some 4,000 POWs were confined at Honouliuli; repatriation efforts began in December 1945 and continued into 1946.

== Abandonment and recognition ==
After the camp's closure, the land was leased by the Oahu Sugar Company from the Campbell Estate and sugar cane was grown on adjacent lands. In 2007, the Monsanto Corporation purchased the land.

The fact that Honouliuli Gulch had once held an internment camp was largely forgotten as fast-growing vegetation filled the gulch and the flimsy structures deteriorated. Jane Kurahara, a volunteer from the Japanese Cultural Center of Hawaiʻi, located it in 2002 by tracing an aqueduct in the background of an old photo. The efforts to learn more about the camp's history attracted the attention of the National Park Service (NPS). A follow-up NPS survey concluded that the camp was eligible for listing on the National Register of Historic Places. The site and the U.S. Immigration Station in Honolulu played a central role as internment sites in Hawaiʻi during World War II. The site met the criteria for national significance and was added to the register on February 21, 2012.

On July 6, 2012, the state created an advisory group to develop and present recommendations for an educational resource center to lawmakers in the next legislative session. Two buildings and some other remnants still remain at the site, which current-owner Monsanto is interested in transferring to the National Park Service. The site was designated Honouliuli National Monument by Presidential Proclamation on February 24, 2015, by President Barack Obama. The site was formally dedicated as a U.S. National Monument on March 31, 2015, in a ceremony at the Japanese Cultural Center of Hawaiʻi. In attendance were the United States Secretary of the Interior Sally Jewell, the Governor of Hawaiʻi David Ige, the Mayor of Honolulu Kirk Caldwell, and Senators Mazie Hirono and Brian Schatz. The new national monument is without formal services and programs but the Japanese Cultural Center of Hawaiʻi has been providing information to the public. The Japanese Cultural Center of Hawaiʻi conducts public tours of the former camp. The University of Hawaiʻi at West Oʻahu and the Japanese Cultural Center of Hawaiʻi are two institutions that potentially will have increased access to the site under the auspices of the National Park Service. The John D. Dingell Jr. Conservation, Management, and Recreation Act, signed into law March 12, 2019, redesignated it as a national historic site. The designation will assist in receiving federal resources for preservation and maintenance.

== Notable internees ==
- Sanji Abe (1895–1982), legislator for the Territory of Hawaiʻi
- Seishiro Okazaki (Henry) (1890–1951), noted healer and founder of the Danzan-ryū Jujutsu system
- Thomas Sakakihara (1900–1989), legislator for the Territory of Hawaiʻi
- Pak Sun-dong, Japanese Imperial Army draftee who later worked for the US Office of Strategic Services and wrote an award-winning memoir
- Harry Urata (1917–2009), music teacher; also interned at Tule Lake

== In popular culture ==
Honouliuli Internment Camp is depicted in the episode "Ho'onani Makuakane" (season 4, episode 10) of the 2010s TV series-remake Hawaii Five-0, which is about a murder committed in the camp.

== Sources ==
- 朴順東 [Pak Sun-dong] (1967), 侮蔑의時代 [An Era of Humiliation] (in Korean (South Korea)), Seoul: 知文閣 [Chimun'gak], OCLC 40497594
- Choe, Yong-ho (April 2009), "Korean Prisoners-of-War in Hawaii During World War II and the Case of US Navy Abduction of Three Korean Fishermen", Japan Focus: The Asia Pacific Journal
- Hirose, Stacey (1993), "Honouliuli", in Niiya, Brian (ed.), Japanese American history: an A-to-Z reference from 1868 to the present, Verlag für die Deutsche Wirtschaft AG, ISBN 978-0-8160-2680-7
- Kashima, Tetsuden (2003), Judgment without trial: Japanese American imprisonment during World War II, The Scott and Laurie Oki series in Asian American studies, University of Washington Press, ISBN 978-0-295-98299-1
- Rosenfeld, Alan (August 27, 2013), "Honouliuli (detention facility)", Densho Encyclopedia
