= Looking Like the Enemy =

2014 non-fiction book

Looking Like the Enemy: Japanese Mexicans, the Mexican State, and US Hegemony, 1897–1945
- First edition
- Author: Jerry Garcia
- Genre: Non-fiction
- Publication date: 2014

Looking Like the Enemy: Japanese Mexicans, the Mexican State, and US Hegemony, 1897–1945 is a 2014 non-fiction book by Jerry García, published by The University of Arizona Press. It discusses the treatment of Mexicans of Japanese descent and Japanese nationals in Mexico during World War II, as well as the overall history from 1897 to the war.

This book is the first one in English that specifically focuses on the Japanese Mexicans; Michael Palencia-Roth of the University of Illinois wrote that the Japanese populations in Brazil, Peru, and the United States were more commonly the focus of such studies. The author argued that Mexico had more lenient actions towards the ethnic Japanese during the war than the United States.

== Background ==
García is a professor of Mexican American Studies at Eastern Washington University.

The book has interviews, with the text containing excerpts of two of them. J. M. Starling of Choice Reviews stated that these two stated that the Japanese Mexican people removed to internment camps perceived their experiences to be "humane" and that the interviews "frame several of the book's key arguments".

The author used the 1976 book México y Japón en el siglo XIX and the 1982 book Siete migraciones japonesas en México, both by María Elena Ota Mishima, as well as the 1990 book Relaciones entre México y Japón durante el Porfiriato by Enrique Cortés, as the bases of his research.

García used content, including descriptions from people, images, and government documents, from the archives of Mexico and the United States. Toake Endoh of Hawaii Tokai International College wrote that material from Japan in the research "is disproportionately scarce".

== Contents ==
The book, using chronological order, has an introduction, six chapters, and a conclusion. Initially the book talks about the genesis, formation, and evolution of the Mexican Japanese community before World War II, while at a later point it discusses the consequences of the war. Each chapter follows the introduction, body, and conclusion format.

The introduction discusses the said creation and/or the international relations between the mother country, the destination country, and the bordering United States. Chapter 1 deals with some of the same topics as the introduction. Chapter 2 refers to Orientalism and the Mexican Revolution. Chapter 3 discusses the political environment between the revolution and the entry of the United States in World War II. Chapter 4 discusses the anti-Japanese sentiment that arrived as a consequence of U.S. involvement in World War II. Chapter 5 discusses downward social mobility of the Japanese as a result of the war, as does Chapter 6.

Jeffrey Lesser of Emory University wrote that the book "avoids the trap of treating the history of Japanese Mexicans as so unique as to be of self-contained importance" and instead compares them with other immigrant groups in Latin America.

Page five of the book stated that the processes of the community formation occurred among "Mexican modernity, revolution, and reconstruction", and the book also explores identity politics and whiteness.

== Reception ==
Yuichiro Onishi of the University of Minnesota, Twin Cities wrote that the analysis presented by the author is "compelling" due to the author's "attention to local circumstances". He added that the discussion on integration into the Mexican community being "Particularly interesting", with the book also containing "a myriad of little known episodes" of historical events.

Starling concluded that it was "Highly recommended" and gave three stars. He argued that the book should have had more variety in sourcing.

Palencia-Roth wrote that "This book should be required reading in the fields of Asian immigration and of borderland studies." Of the chapters he stated that they were "lucidly presented, well-researched but somewhat repetitive".

Endoh wrote that "the work is engaging and accessible reading for both general and scholarly audiences" and that the "findings and wealth of documents are valuable additions to the study of Japanese migration, and should inspire future research." He praised the use of archival material and added that the pre-World War II immigration discussion is "One of the major strengths of this book". Endoh criticized what he perceived as a lack of explanation of certain issues such as relations between Japan and the Japanese Mexicans and explaining how different Mexican communities had different responses to the Japanese in World War II.

Lesser wrote that he was "so engrossed in" the work that he forgot to disembark at his planned bus stop, and concluded the work "is a strong addition to a growing literature on Latin Americans of immigrant descent." He criticized the lack of precision in some vocabulary, such as what was meant with the word "Japanese", but characterized that as one of several minor "quibbles" reviewers of academic literature frequently have. He praised portions discussing Mexican adaptation of anti-Japanese propaganda from the U.S. and the involvement of ethnic Japanese in the Mexican Revolution.

Eric Boime of San Diego State University Imperial Valley Campus wrote that the book "proves more than up to the task [...] to recover the Japanese experience in Mexico through World War II."

== See also ==
- The Japanese in Latin America - Discusses various ethnic Japanese communities in Latin America
