= Liceo Mexicano Japonés =

Location
- Camino a Santa Teresa 1500, Álvaro Obregón, Jardines del Pedregal, 01900; Mexico City; Mexico
- 19°18′32.7″N 99°12′43.2″W

Information
- Type: Primary and secondary education
- Grades: K-12
- Website: liceomexicanojapones.edu.mx

Liceo Mexicano Japonés (lit. 'Mexican-Japanese Lyceum') (Note: Japanese: 社団法人日本メキシコ学院 Shadan Hōjin Nihon Mekishiko Gakuin or 日墨学院 Nichiboku Gakuin; lit. 'Japan-Mexico Institute') is a Japanese school based in the Pedregal neighborhood of the Álvaro Obregón borough in the southern part of Mexico City.

The school was founded and chaired by Japanese-Mexican businessman Carlos Kasuga Osaka, who also founded and directed Yakult Mexico.

María Dolores Mónica Palma Mora, author of De tierras extrañas: un estudio sobre las inmigración en México, 1950–1990, wrote that the school is a "central institution in the life" of the Japanese Mexican group. Chizuko Hōgen Watanabe (千鶴子・ホーゲン・渡邊), the author of the master's thesis "The Japanese Immigrant Community in Mexico Its History and Present" at the California State University, Los Angeles, stated that Japanese parents chose the school because they wanted to "maintain their ethnic identity and pride, to implant a spiritual heritage that they claim is the basis for success, and to establish close ties with other Nikkei children who live in distant areas."

Since 1983 many Nikkei and Japanese came to the school to study its management techniques and problems. The Liceo Mexicano Japonés is the first transnational educational institution among the Nikkei community.

== History ==
Over one decade of organizational activity occurred before the school's opening. The merger process forming the school began in 1974. It was a merger of a preparatory school, and three of Mexico City's four part-time Japanese schools.

The proposals to build the school were controversial in the Mexico City Nikkei community, and Watanabe stated that the school's importance and that of the Asocación Mexicana Japonesa "is indicated by the fact that the establishment and management of them has been the source of much strife among the community members". Because of this, about 12 police officers protected the July 1967 annual general meeting to protect it from rioting, and the general meeting had received threats of violence. Watanabe stated that after the Liceo Mexicano Japones was completed, "the antagonism subsided and unity in the community seems to prevail at present".

The founding of the school occurred after a visit to Mexico by Prime Minister of Japan Kakuei Tanaka. The Government of Japan donated 300 million yen to finance the school's construction in 1975. Tanaka later placed the school's first stone. The school, inaugurated by President of Mexico Luis Echeverría, and by Secretary of Education of Mexico Porfirio Muñoz Ledo, opened in September 1977. The governments of Japan and Mexico accredited the school. The Nisei in Mexico were the primary party who had the school built because they wanted their children to have the Japanese cultural heritage. In 1984 the high school was inaugurated. Takeo Fukuda, the Prime Minister of Japan, visited the school that year.

The school, which covered kindergarten through secondary school, eventually gained over 1,000 students, including Mexicans, Nikkeijin, children of Japanese business owners resident in Mexico, and children of Japanese diplomats.

Daniel M. Masterson, author of The Japanese in Latin America, wrote that it "became one of the most prestigious schools" in Mexico. According to the Mexico Journal, because President of Mexico Carlos Salinas de Gortari sent his children to the school, people within Japan perceived the Liceo Mexicano Japonés as being the best school in Mexico. Salinas said that he sent the children to the school because the Japanese culture has an emphasis on design and discipline. At the time the Mexican government was expanding trade with Japan, and Japanese influence was increasing in Mexico. At the time the Mexican authorities were taking efforts to attract further Japanese economic activity.

In 1997, there was an accusation that a preparatory level student sexually assaulted a primary level student. The accused student was expelled due to parental pressure. The Juvenile Board did not find the student guilty. The Procuraduría Federal del Consumidor fined the school for cancelling a trip of that student, giving the school a penalty of 1.870 million pesos. In November there were accusations that government officials with children enrolled in the school pressured the school to expel the accused student.

In 1997 the city of Nagoya, which was celebrating its 20th anniversary of sister city relations with Mexico City, began its exchange with the school. From then on, the school on an annual basis sends a cultural exchange group to Nagoya.

== Curriculum and academics ==
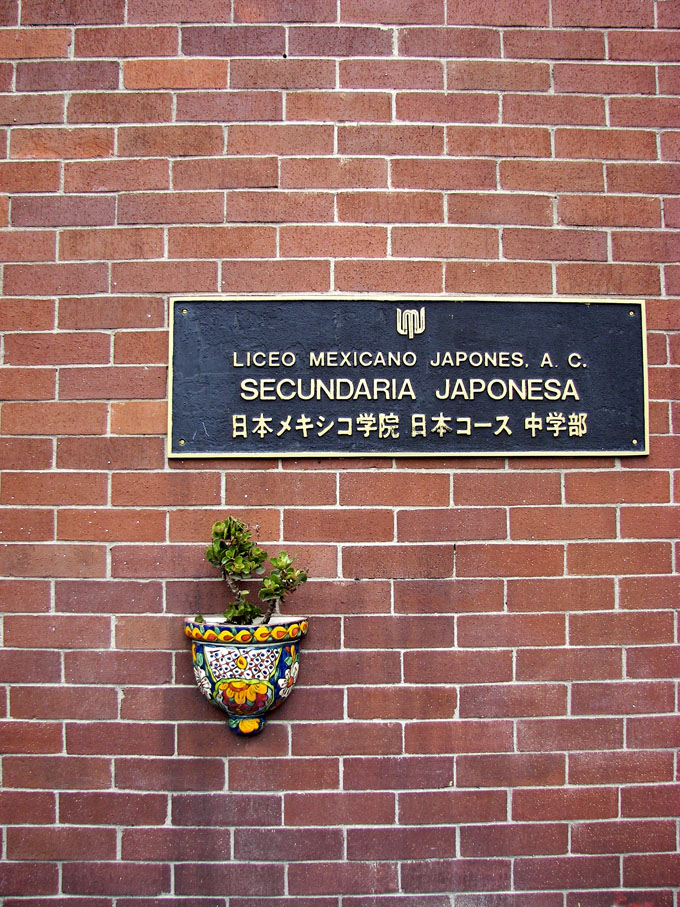
The junior high school of the Japanese section

The school has two sections: The Mexican section with Spanish-language classes and a curriculum according to the Mexican Secretariat of Public Education (SEP) and the National Autonomous University of Mexico (UNAM), and the Japanese section with classes in Japanese and a curriculum according to the Japanese Ministry of Education, Culture, Sports, Science and Technology (MEXT).

Most classes for Mexicans are in the Spanish language. Mexican students spend ten hours per week on the Japanese language. Classes offered include art, Japanese calligraphy, judo, karate, music, and the tea ceremony.

According to the 2012 "Ranking de las Mejores Prepas en la Ciudad de México" ("Ranking of the best preparatory schools in Mexico City") of the Diario Reforma, the school had the highest rank. The ranking had over 380 university academics and company directors evaluating 67 private schools in Mexico City. According to the 2014 "Ranking de las Mejores Prepas en la Ciudad de México" of the same newspaper, the school received a score of 8.80, the highest score out of the 80 private schools surveyed. 558 academics from various universities and managers ranked each private school. According to the 2022 "Ranking de las Mejores Prepas en la Ciudad de México" of the same newspaper, the school received a score of 8.99, the highest score out of the 94 private schools surveyed. 207 academics from various universities and managers ranked each private school.

== Campus ==
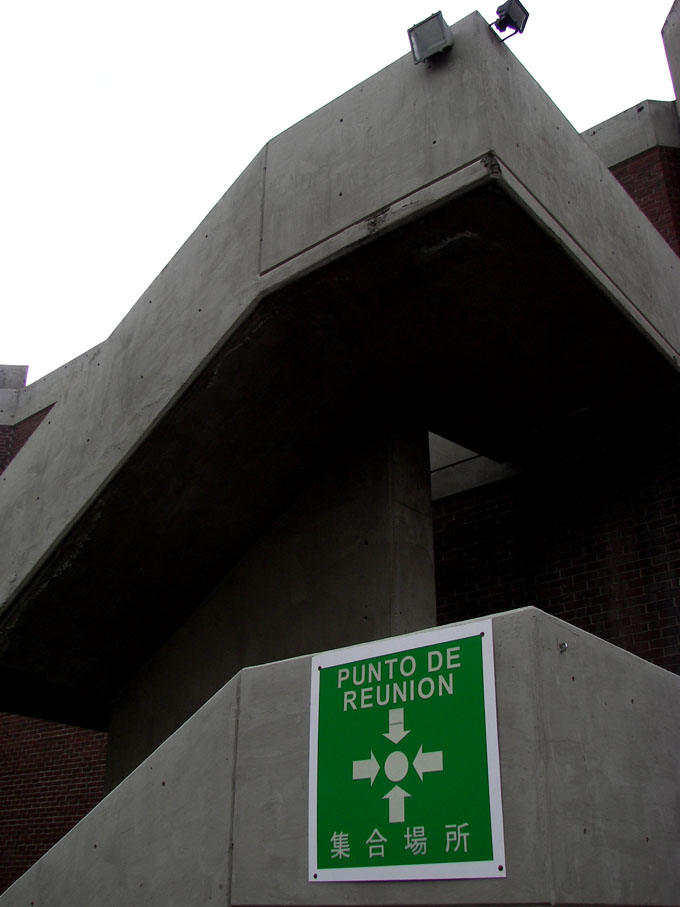
The campus has signage in Spanish and Japanese

The campus has over 36,880.93 square meters (396,983.0 sq ft) of space. The architects of the campus were Mexicans, Pedro Ramírez Vázquez and Manuel Rosen Morrison. Another architect, Rafael Espinoza, collaborated. The Japanese government had commissioned for the design.

There is a mural outside of the gymnasium created in 1987 under the direction of the Yokohama artist Teiko Nishimori (西森 禎子 Nishimori Teiko). 20 LMJ students and 14 visiting children from Japan created the mural.

The school has athletic facilities for several sports, including aikido, basketball, dance, karate, and kendo.

== Demographics ==
According to the school's 1981 enrollment data, that year its Mexican division the school had 150 Kindergarten students, 470 primary school students, 166 middle school students, and 60 high school students. In its Japanese division the school had 282 primary school students and 58 junior high school students.

As of 1983, most non-Nikkei students are from socioeconomically rich families with intellectual backgrounds. Watanabe stated that this because of the school's "location, private nature, and high quality of education".

As of 1983 some Nikkei families living in other Mexican states have their children move to Mexico City and live with their relatives so they can attend this school.

== Extracurricular activities ==
For social purposes the school has athletic events and picnics. The school uses activities and exchanges to bring together the Mexican and Japanese sections of the school. The events by the school include a New Year festival, Mexican Independence Day, Day of the Dead, Epiphany, Las Posadas, Friendship Day, Students' Day, and Children's Day. The holidays are there to teach students about the histories of Japan and Mexico.

As of 1983, of the Japanese school events, the undōkai (運動会 "athletic meets") are the largest events, and Watanabe stated that they function as community events. The school also has ensoku (遠足 "school excursions") and gakugeikai (学芸会 "cultural programs").

== Notable alumni ==
The children of President of Mexico Carlos Salinas de Gortari attended Liceo Mexicano Japonés. Emiliano Salinas attended elementary school at Liceo Mexicano Japonés.

== See also ==
- Japan–Mexico relations
- Japanese community of Mexico City
- Japanese language education in Mexico
- Japanese Mexicans
- Benito Juarez Community Academy

== Bibliography ==
- Masterson, Daniel M. The Japanese in Latin America. University of Illinois Press, 2004. 0252071441, 9780252071447.
- Watanabe, Chizuko. "The Japanese Immigrant Community in Mexico Its History and Present" (Master's Thesis), California State University at Los Angeles, 1983.
