= Mitsuhide =

Mitsuhide is a masculine Japanese given name. Its meaning varies based on the kanji used to write it; possible ways of writing the name in kanji include 三秀, 三英, 光秀, 光英, 満秀, and 満英.

People with this given name include:

- Akechi Mitsuhide (明智 光秀, 1528–1582), general of Japan's Warring States period
- Mitsuhide Hata (畑 満秀, born 1948), Japanese sprint canoer
- Mitsuhide Iwaki (岩城 光英, born 1949), Japanese politician with the Liberal Democratic Party
- Mitsuhide Tsuchida (fl. 1980s), Japanese-born Paraguayan football player
- Captain New Japan (born Mitsuhide Hirasawa (平澤 光秀), 1982), Japanese professional wrestler
