= Issa Lish =

Mexican female model

- Born: 3 May 1995 (age 31); Mexico City, Mexico
- Modeling information
- Height: 1.80 m (5 ft 11 in)
- Hair color: Black
- Eye color: Brown
- Agency: Elite Model Management (New York); Women Management (Paris, Milan); The Squad (London); Scoop Models (Copenhagen); WANTED & BANG! Management (Mexico City)

Issa Lish (born May 3, 1995) is a Mexican fashion model. Lish is known for her distinctive look and has been described as jolie laide.

== Early life ==
In 1995, Lish was born in Mexico City, Mexico. Her father is of Japanese descent.

== Career ==
Lish was discovered at age 14 while working at her father's sushi restaurant, a punishment for bad grades at school.

Lish has appeared on the cover of Vogue México, Vogue Italia and Vogue Japan. She is the third Mexican model to be featured on the cover of Vogue Italia - the first being Elsa Benítez and the second, Liliana Domínguez.

Lish has walked on dozens of catwalks, including shows for Prabal Gurung, Céline, Anna Sui and Prada. She was part of the 2014 Fall-Winter Campaign of Balmain, the Marc Jacobs 2015 Spring Campaign, the 2016 Spring-Summer Campaign of Givenchy as well as the 2016 Fall-Winter Alexander Wang Campaign.

In September 2024, Lish walked the runway at Paris Fashion Week S/S 2025 for Maison Yoshiki Paris, the high fashion brand created by Japanese rock star Yoshiki.

== Personal life ==
Lish speaks five languages: Spanish, Japanese, English, French, and Portuguese.

== See also ==
- Japanese community of Mexico City
