= Antonio del Valle =

Antonio del Valle may refer to:

- Antonio del Valle Ruiz (born 1938), Mexican businessman
- Antonio del Valle Toca (born 1971), Mexican politician
