= Japanese Paraguayans =

Paraguayans of Japanese ethnicity

Hapõ-paraguaigua Japonés Paraguayo 日系パラグアイ人 Nikkei Paraguaijin

Total population
- 5,441 Japanese nationals 10,000 Paraguayans of Japanese descent

Regions with significant populations
- Asunción, La Colmena, several cities in Itapúa and rural areas of the nation

Languages
- Spanish, Guarani, Japanese

Religion
- Roman Catholicism, Buddhism, Shinto

Related ethnic groups
- Japanese diaspora, Japanese Americans, Japanese Canadians, Japanese Mexicans, Japanese Peruvians, Japanese Brazilians

Japanese Paraguayans (Spanish: Japonés Paraguayo; Japanese: 日系パラグアイ人, Nikkei Paraguaijin; Guarani: Hapõ-paraguaigua) are Paraguayans of Japanese ethnicity.

== Religion ==
First-generation Japanese Paraguayans were generally followers of Shinto and Buddhism. The first Japanese settlers at La Colmena brought a piece of stone from the Ise Shrine which was gazetted as a monument mark the settlement's founding. Japanese religious festivals were celebrated within the first few decades among the first and second-generation Japanese settlers and in the late 1960s, a majority identified themselves with the Buddhist and Shinto faiths. Conversion to Roman Catholic Christianity increased from the late 1970s onwards.

== Education ==
In Asunción, there are the Japanese international school: Colegio Japonés en Asunción (アスンシオン日本人学校 Asunshion Nihonjin Gakkō), and the Paraguayan-Japanese Center, which promotes Japanese culture in Paraguay and develops intercultural activities with the two countries and the Paraguayan-Japanese financial brokerage company; in Encarnación, the Japanese Association of Encarnación, Asociación Japonesa de Encarnación; and in Ciudad del Este, the Japanese Association of the East Asociación Japonesa del Este and the Escuela Japonesa de Ciudad del Este Primary School.

== Notable people ==
- Mitsuhide Tsuchida, footballer
- Eduardo Nakayama, politician.

== See also ==
- Japan–Paraguay relations
- Japanese diaspora
- Immigration to Paraguay

== Bibliography ==
- Masterson, Daniel M. and Sayaka Funada-Classen. (2004), The Japanese in Latin America: The Asian American Experience. Urbana, Illinois: University of Illinois Press. ISBN 978-0-252-07144-7; OCLC 253466232
