= Escuela Bancaria y Comercial =

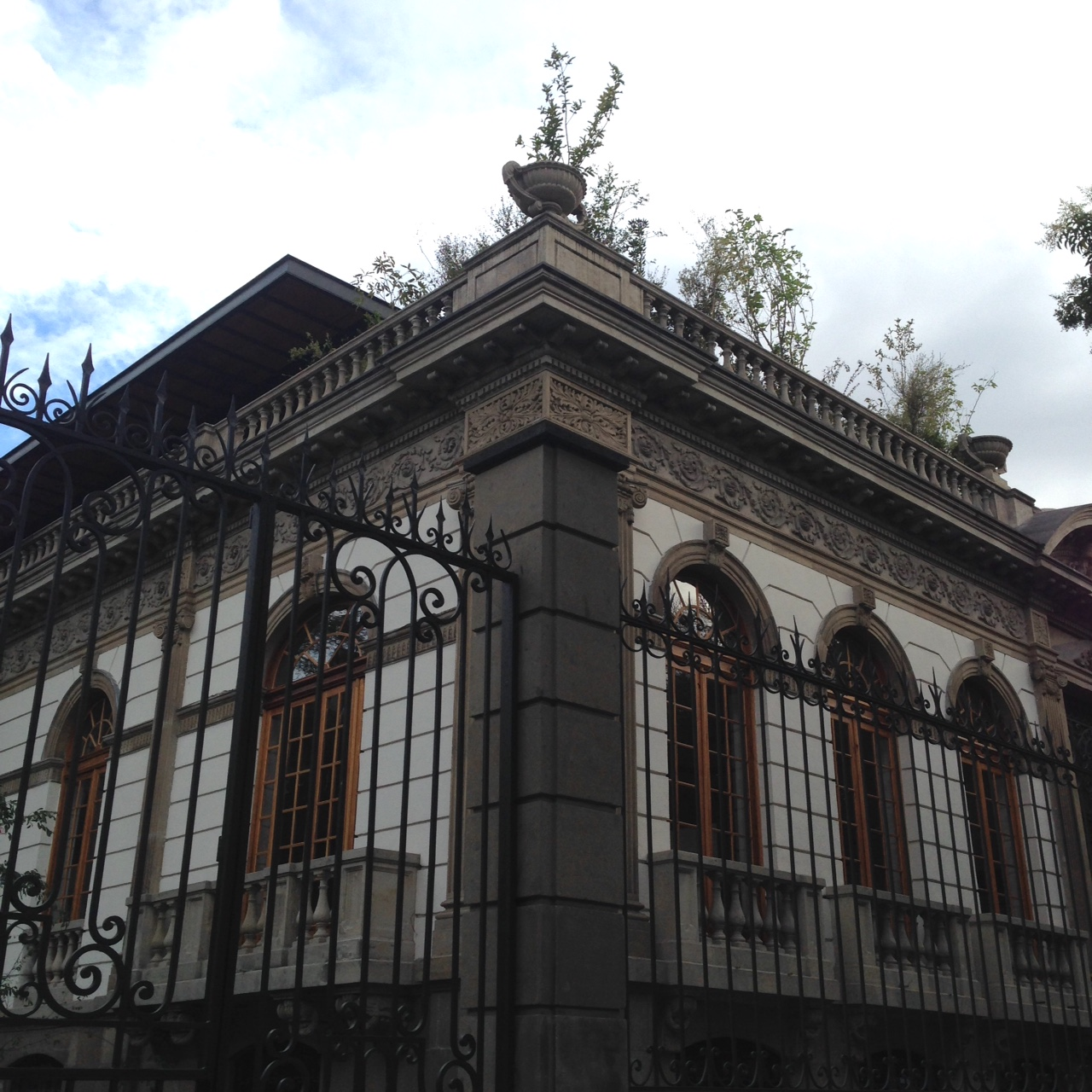
- EBC's building on Liverpool Street, Mexico City
- Motto: La Escuela Mexicana de Negocios
- Motto in English: The Business School of Mexico
- Type: Private
- Established: 1929
- Rector: Carlos Prieto Sierra
- Website: www.ebc.mx

Escuela Bancaria y Comercial (EBC) is a higher education institution which markets itself as The Business School of Mexico. Since its establishment in 1929 by National Action Party founder Manuel Gómez Morín, the school has spread from its Mexico City base to further campuses across Mexico.

Students can study for a variety of business-related bachelor's degrees or for MBAs. Notable former students include Arturo Warman, Carlos Kasuga Osaka (of Yakult), Roberto Servitje Sendra (of Bimbo), Antonio del Valle Ruiz of Mexichem and Alfonso Ferreira León (of PricewaterhouseCoopers).

The institution has a scholarship program called Fundacion EBC (EBC Foundation). Created in 2005, the foundation gives scholarships to talented people with financial limitations who are seeking quality higher education. Their values are honesty, respect, equity and professionalism.
