= Thomas Sakakihara =

American politician

Thomas Tameichi Sakakihara (榊原為一, Sakakihara Tameichi; 1900–1989), referred to locally as Tommy Sakakihara in person and in print, was a Japanese American politician from Hawaii, interned due to his ancestry during World War II.

== Political career ==
Sakakihara joined the Republican Party and first ran for political office in 1926. He was elected to the legislature of the Territory of Hawaii in 1932, and served continuously then on for several terms.

In 1941, Sakakihara was one of six Americans of Japanese ancestry serving in the territorial legislature. After the attack on Pearl Harbor, he was made a deputy sheriff of Hilo, but was later discharged from that position. The intersection of Sakakihara's ancestry and rise to prominence set him up for negative attention from the US Army's Hawaii sub-command. He had earlier been listed on the Plan of Initial Seizure of Orange Nationals drawn up by George S. Patton between 1935 and 1937, among 127 other Japanese American community leaders. Then on February 26, 1942, Sakakihara and roughly thirty other prominent Japanese "enemy aliens or suspected sympathisers" were arrested by the Army. He was held at the Honouliuli Internment Camp until 1943; his release was conditional on a signed pledge not to sue the U.S. government for damages related to the internment.

Unlike fellow legislator and Honouliuli internee Sanji Abe, Sakakihara returned to politics after the end of World War II; he and five other Japanese Americans were elected to the Hawaii territorial House of Representatives for 1947. He was re-elected in 1948, along with fellow Japanese Americans Takao Yamauchi and Joe Itagaki. He also served as one of the vice-presidents of the 1950 Hawaii State Constitutional Convention. He found a strong political base among small sugar-growers. Eventually, his long service and political support earned him a position as chairman of the legislature's Finance Committee. He was also instrumental in getting increased funding for the Hawaii Vocational College (later the Hilo branch of the University of Hawaii). However, he and other Asian American Republicans lost their legislative seats in the Hawaii Democratic Revolution of 1954; Sakakihara himself was accused in a full-page ad in the Hilo Tribune-Herald by the International Longshore and Warehouse Union of taking salary kickbacks from his legislative workers.

== Personal life and other activities ==
Sakakihara was born on July 17, 1900, in Hilo, Hawaii, to parents Shinzo and Hisa (née Hagihara). He gained familiarity with the law by working in the office of a local lawyer. His law career culminated in 14 years of service as District Judge for the Big Island of Hawaii. On April 15, 1933, he married Aileen Sadako Arizumi, with whom he had two children. Of small stature and build, he affected a dapper image, walking with a cane he admitted he did not actually need. His friends described him as aggressive and feisty. He was said to be fond of Black & White whisky, and served it during his frequent parties at the Young Hotel.

As late as 1970, Sakakihara was listed as a field representative for the office of Senator Hiram Fong. He did not speak out publicly about his internment until February 1976, when the Honolulu Star-Bulletin interviewed a number of former Honouliuli internees for a front-page story about President Gerald Ford's rescindment of Executive Order 9066. He died on February 22, 1989.
