= Arturo Warman =

Mexican politician

Arturo ("Jack") Warman Gryj (9 September 1937 – 21 October 2003) was a Mexican anthropologist, member of the cabinets of Carlos Salinas and Ernesto Zedillo, also an author of nine books, two of which have been translated to English. He also wrote multiple articles for the magazine Nexos. He has also taught social epistemology at the University of Chile.

== Biography ==
Warman's parents, Elena Gryj and Isaac Warman, were Polish immigrants of Jewish origin who immigrated to Mexico through France in 1927. Warman studied elementary school at the Colegio Israelita de México and dropped after starting his secondary-level courses amidst a brief religious conflict with himself. He then enrolled in the Escuela Bancaria y Comercial because he wanted to be a banker, and graduated in 1955. He enrolled in the Mexican Navy and played American football until he experienced a bone fracture in his hand.

In 1956 he became interested in music and started recording his own songs, he enrolled in writing courses at the UNAM but dropped out after not being able to apply his knowledge to songwriting. In 1957 he continued his secondary-level studies graduated and enrolled in high school while he enrolled at the Sociedad Folklórica de México (then headed by Vicente T. Mendoza), he dropped off in 1960 and in 1961 he enrolled at the Escuela Nacional de Antropología e Historia graduating with a master's degree in anthropology in 1968.

== Work with the government ==
He was the director of the Instituto Nacional Indigenista (INI, National Institute for the Indigenous People), 1988–1991, Procuraduría Agraria (1991–1994) and Secretaría de la Reforma Agraria (SRA, Secretariat of the Agrarian Reform 1994–1999) which was the new name for the Secretaría de Agricultura y Recursos Hidráulicos (SARH, Secretariat of Agriculture and Water Resources) of the federal government of Mexico.

As director of the Procuraduría Agraria during the Carlos Salinas administration, he fought for the preservation of the ejidos while there was a discussion on disappearing them. He was part of a team that discussed and elaborated initiatives of Constitutional Reforms and the Agrarian Law. He also established guidelines for a delegation of the Procuraduría in each state, a residency for every 300 ejidos and rural communities and a representative to each 30 rural nuclear groups.

== Cátedra Interinstitucional Arturo Warman ==
Upon his death in 2003, the Cátedra Interinstitucional Arturo Warman, an agreement in honor of the contribution of Warman to the culture of Mexico. It was signed by the following institutions:

- National Autonomous University of Mexico (UNAM)
- National Institute of Anthropology and History (INAH)
- El Colegio de México, A.C. (COLMEX)
- Centro de Investigaciones y Estudios Superiores en Antropología Social (CIESAS)
- Universidad Autónoma Metropolitana (UAM)
- Universidad Iberoamericana (UIA)
- Colegio de Etnólogos y Antropólogos A.C.

The Cátedra will award those who it considers have contributed to the fields Warman dedicated his life to.

== Books ==
- Los indios mexicanos en el umbral del milenio ("Mexican Indians on the threshold of the new millennium" (2003) Mexico, Fondo de Cultura Económica.
- El campo mexicano en el siglo XX (2001) Mexico, Fondo de Cultura Económica.
- La historia de un bastardo: maíz y capitalismo (1988), Mexico, Instituto de Investigaciones Sociales–UNAM / Fondo de Cultura Económica. Published in English as Corn and Capitalism: How a Botanical Bastard Grew to Global Dominance, Chapel Hill and Londres, by The University of North Carolina Press.
- Estrategias de sobrevivencia de los campesinos mayas (1985) Mexico. Instituto de Investigaciones Sociales–UNAM.
- Ensayos sobre el campesinado en México (1980) Mexico, Nueva Imagen.
- Y venimos a contradecir, los campesinos de Morelos y el Estado nacional (1975) Mexico Centro de Investigaciones Superiores del Instituto Nacional de Antropología e Historia and (1988) by the Secretaría de Educación Pública. Translated in English by Stephen Ault as We Come to Object, the Peasants of Morelos and the National State (1980) Baltimore, The Johns Hopkins University Press.
- Los campesinos hijos predilectos del régimen (1972) Mexico, Editorial Nuestro Tiempo
- La danza de moros y cristianos (1972), Mexico, Secretaría de Educación Pública and (1985), Mexico, Instituto Nacional de Antropología e Historia.
- La danza de moros y cristianos, master's thesis for the Anthropology Science degree at the Escuela Nacional de Antropología e Historia, Mexico.

Preceded by Miguel Limón Rojas	Secretary of the Agrarian Reform; 1995 - 1999	Succeeded by Eduardo Robledo Rincón
Preceded by Carlos Hank González	Secretary of Agriculture; 1994 - 1995	Succeeded by Francisco Labastida Ochoa
