= Sanji Abe =

American politician

Sanji Abe (阿部三次, Abe Sanji; 1895–1982) was a pre-World War II politician in Hawaii. He was the first Japanese American elected to the Senate of the Territory of Hawaii.

== Early life and political career ==
Abe was born in Kailua, Hawaii in 1895 to immigrant parents from Japan, Matsujiro and Raku, who had arrived in the islands two years earlier as migrant workers from Fukuoka. He attended public schools there. He entered the police department as a Japanese interpreter in 1918, and as a member of the Hawaii National Guard was taken into the United States Army with his fellow guardsmen to serve in World War I. After the war, he rose to the rank of deputy sheriff. He was married to Asami Miyose Abe, with whom he had six children.

In 1940, Abe became the first American of Japanese ancestry to be elected to Hawaii's territorial senate; he ran from the South Hilo district as a Republican. His dual citizenship of the U.S. and Japan became a hotly discussed issue during his election campaign. His citizenship issues first came to public attention in early October; soon afterwards, Abe announced that he would be renouncing his Japanese citizenship. He received confirmation of his expatriation on November 2.

== Arrests and detention ==
The intersection of Abe's ancestry and rise to prominence set him up for negative attention from the US Army's Hawaii sub-command; he was arrested on August 2, 1942, roughly eight months after the Japanese attack on Pearl Harbor brought the United States into World War II. Two days later, he was formally charged with possession of a Japanese flag. However, at the time he was charged, this was not in fact an offence; with martial law in effect, the Army issued an order making this a crime, but that was not until six days after his arrest. As a result, he was released by a military tribunal two weeks later. The flag in question was a prop in a movie theater which Abe owned jointly; he suspected that it had been planted.

However, the Army took Abe into "custodial detention" anyway soon after, a fact which they did not publicly announce until September 8. This time, no charge was filed against him. The writ of habeas corpus had been suspended due to martial law. Unable to serve out his term as a state senator, Abe resigned from his elected post on February 4, 1943, stating as his reason that he wished "to protect the people of the territory and the legislature from unjust outside attacks." He was the last Japanese American to resign from the Hawaii territorial legislature; his resignation marked the first time since 1931 that Hawaii had no state legislators of Japanese extraction. Abe would be held for a total of nineteen months, first at Sand Island, and then at the Honouliuli Internment Camp, where fellow Japanese American legislator Thomas Sakakihara was also detained. He was released on July 12, 1944; in an interview with the Honolulu Star-Bulletin soon after, he stated that "my conscience is clear".

== Later activities ==
Unlike fellow internee Sakakihara, Abe did not return to politics after the end of World War II. He died on November 26, 1982, at the Castle Memorial Hospital.

== Bibliography ==
- Whitehead, John S. (2004), Completing the union: Alaska, Hawai'i, and the battle for statehood, American Histories of the Frontier Series, UNM Press, ISBN 978-0-8263-3637-8
- Robinson, Greg (2009), A Tragedy of Democracy: Japanese Detention in North America, Columbia University Press, ISBN 978-0-231-12922-0
- Name Index: Abe, Sanji (PDF), Hawaii State Archives, 2009
