= Antonio del Valle Ruiz =

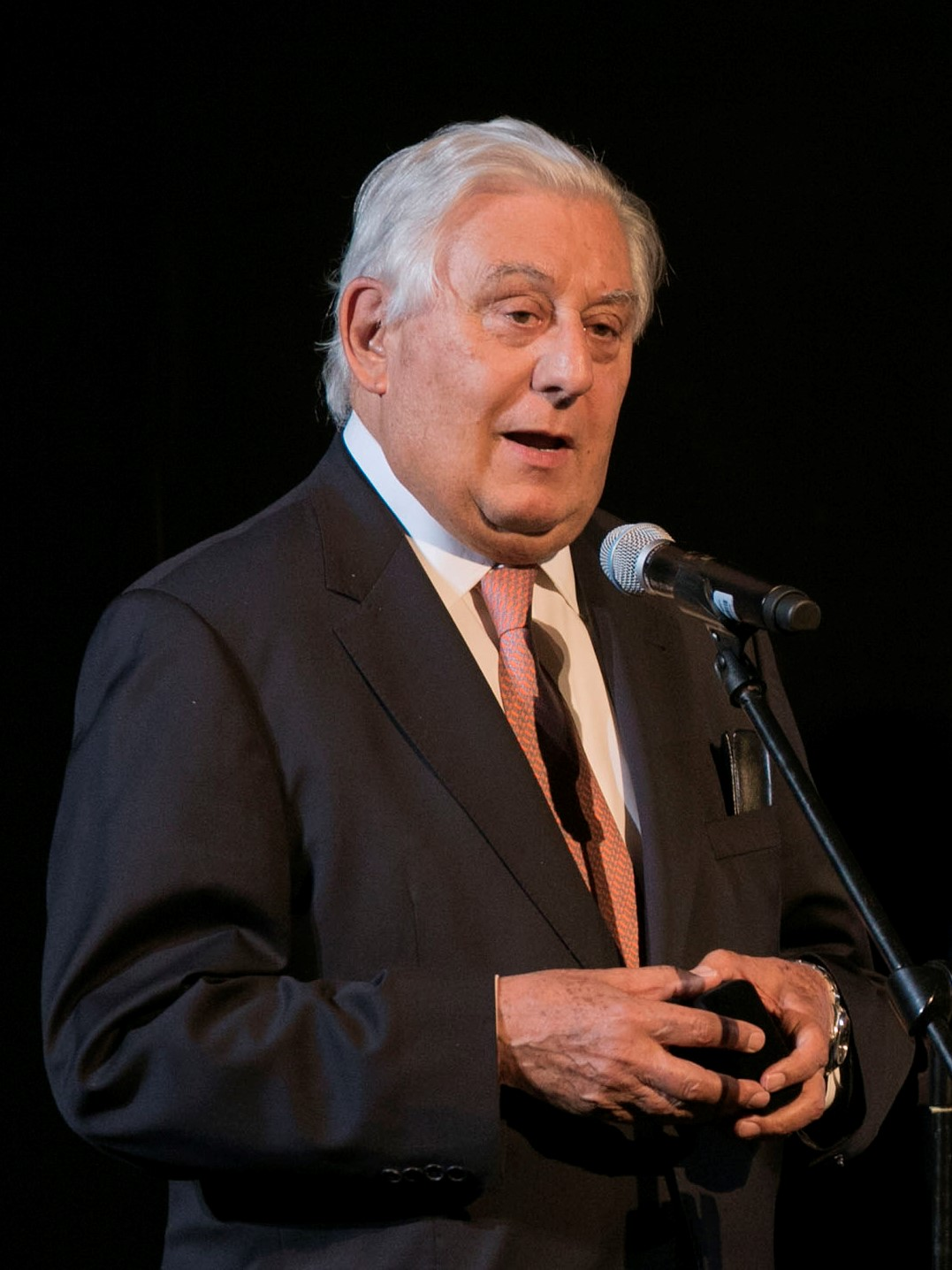
- Born: 1938 or 1939 (age 87–88)
- Education: Escuela Bancaria y Comercial
- Occupations: Chairman, Mexichem
- Children: 5

Antonio del Valle Ruiz (born 1938) is a Mexican businessman, chairman of the chemicals company Mexichem.

== Early life ==
Antonio del Valle Ruiz was born in Mexico. He graduated with a degree in accounting from the Escuela Bancaria y Comercial.

== Career ==
According to Forbes, del Valle Ruiz has a net worth of $4.2 billion, as of January 2015.

== Personal life ==
He is married with five children and lives in Mexico City.
