= Acacoyagua Municipality =

Municipality in the Mexican state of Chiapas

- Municipality
- Coat of arms

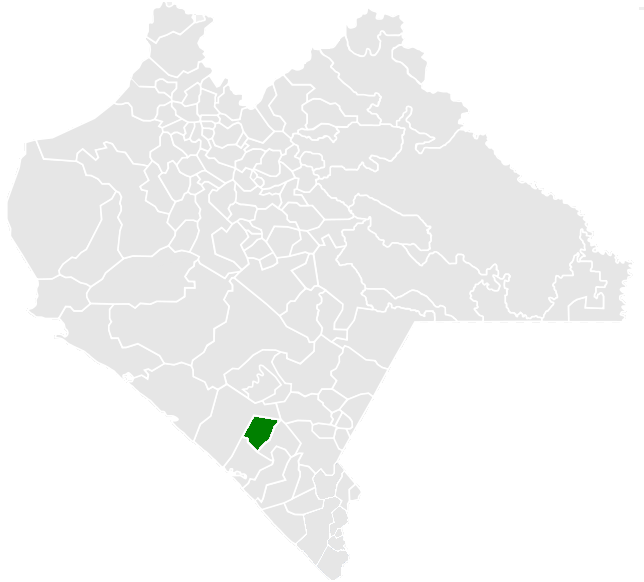
- Municipality of Acacoyagua in Chiapas

- Location in Mexico
- Coordinates: 15°21′N 92°39′W
- Country: Mexico
- State: Chiapas

Area
  - Total: 73.9 sq mi (191.3 km^{2})

Population (2020)
  - Total: 17,994
  - Density: 243.6/sq mi (94.06/km^{2})
- Climate: Am

Acacoyagua Municipality is a municipality in the Mexican state of Chiapas in southern Mexico. As of 2020, the municipality had a total population of 17,994, up from 14,189 as of 2005.

== History ==
The area is notable for being the place where the first organized Japanese immigrants settled in Mexico. In 1897, thirty five initial colonists led by Enomoto Takeaki arrived to work on coffee farms, making Mexico the first Latin American country to receive Japanese immigrants. Although the coffee endeavor failed, the colonists began farming vegetables and flowers. Over the following 30 years, six more "waves" of migrants followed. As most of the migrants were men, marriage with local women and conversion to Roman Catholicism was common.

Nikkei have become Municipal President, the first being Juvencio Nishizama Cruz in 1954 and the latest being José Martín Nomura Hernandez in 2005. The main garden in town has Japanese influences and there is a monument commemorating the Japanese migrants.

In May 1997, Prince Akishino, Ambassador Teresuke Terada and members of the Japanese Navy visited the town to mark the hundred year anniversary of the arrival of the first colonists.

== Demographics ==
As of 2010, the town of Acacoyagua had a population of 7,515. Other than the town of Acacoyagua, the municipality had 152 localities, the largest of which (with 2010 populations in parentheses) was: Hidalgo (1,209), classified as rural.
