= Fumiko Nakashima =

Japanese artist

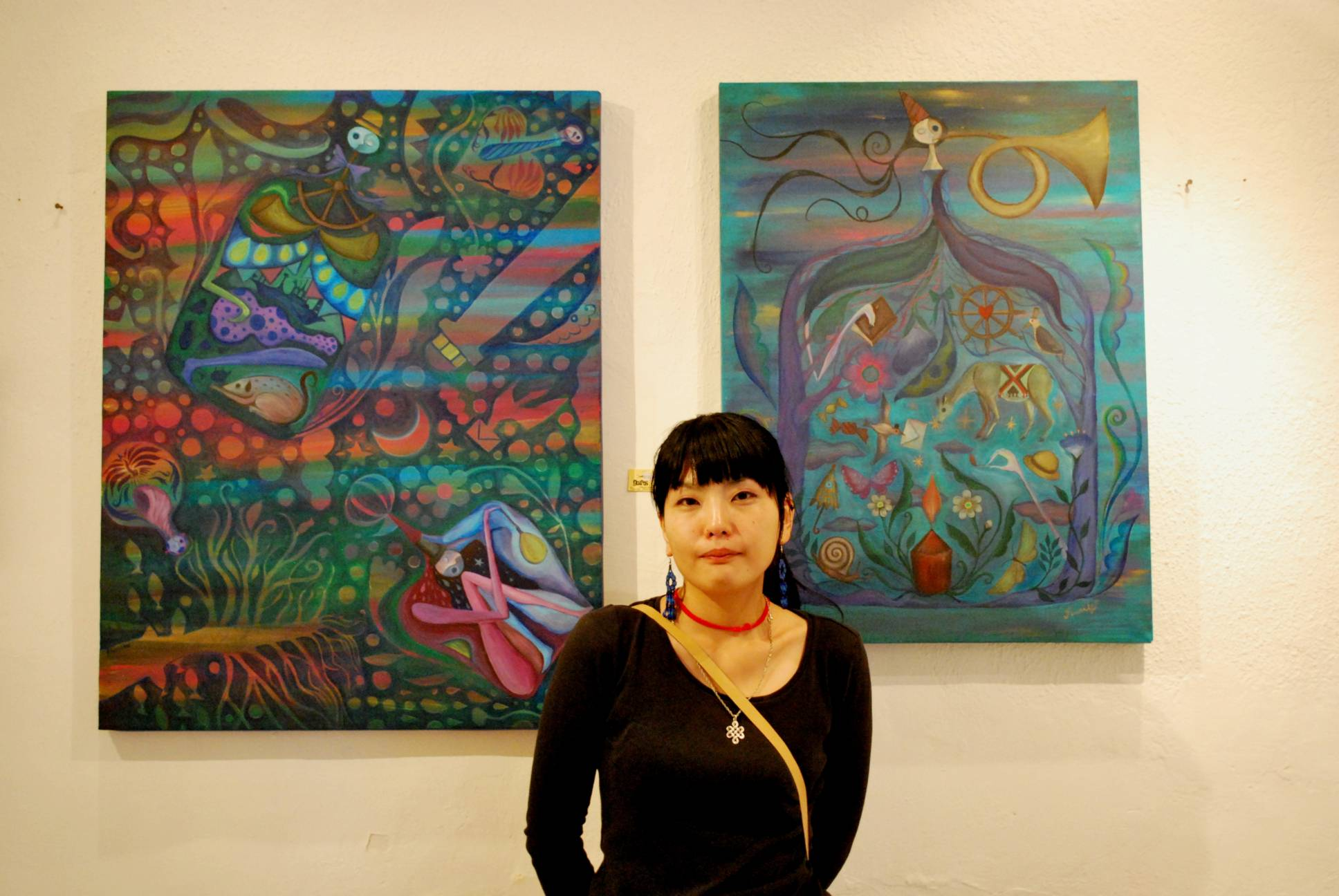
Fumiko Nakashima with two of her works at the Garros Galería in Mexico City

Fumiko Nakashima (中島 布美子, Nakashima Fumiko) is a Japanese artist who lives in Mexico. She began exhibiting works in various galleries in Japan but has since settled in the Colonia Roma neighborhood of Mexico City. Her interest in Mexico came when she was seventeen, visiting the country two times to study culture and language before moving permanently in 2010. She has exhibited works in Mexico City, which include the painting of an old trolleybus in the Colonia Hipódromo neighborhood and organizing an event called Pray for Japan in response to the 2011 Tōhoku earthquake and tsunami.

== Life ==
Fumiko Nakashima was born in Iwate, Japan.

She visited Mexico for the first time in 1999 studying the art of Frida Kahlo and Diego Rivera as well as that of the Huichol, leading to interest in other aspects of Mexican culture such as the commemorations of Day of the Dead.

During her second visit in 2006, she decided to stay for almost two years to have contact with the culture and the art of Mexico as well as to learn Spanish. She states that it was not easy but she met many friends who helped her learn and adapt to life in Mexico. During this time, she exhibited at Garros Galería and the Japanese embassy in Mexico.

She returned permanently to Mexico in 2010, as one of a number of Japanese artists.

As a response to the massive earthquake in Japan, Nakashima organized Pray for Japan in July 2011, with Garros Galería and the Salón de la Plástica Mexicana member Celso Zubire at the CONACULTA gallery in Colonia Roma. The exhibition included other Japanese artists.

== Art ==
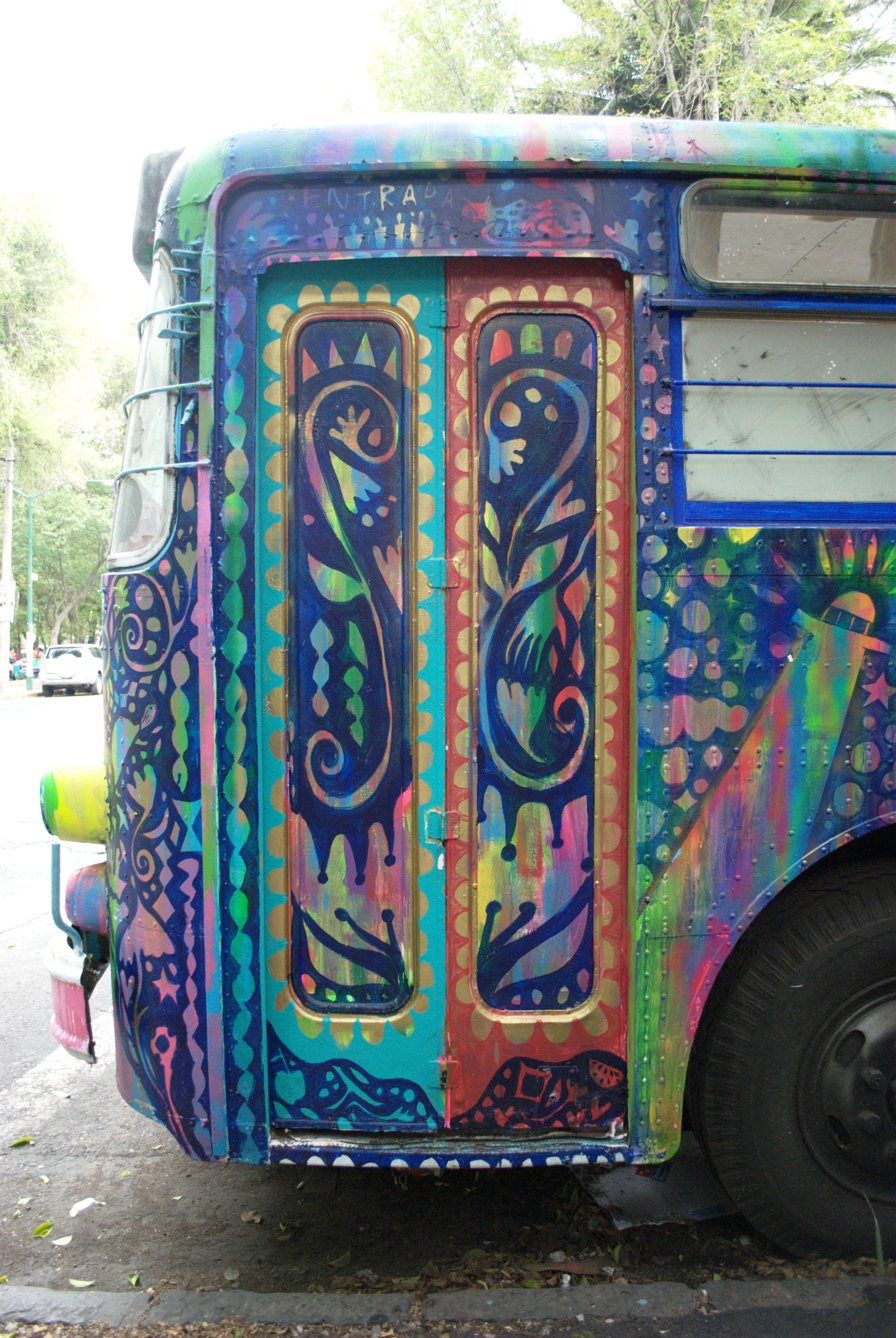
Section of the trolleybus work "Double Life"

In February 2012, Nakashima created a work called "Doble Vida" or "Double Life" using one of the trolleybuses of Roma, Condesa and Hipódromo, which were donated by the Japanese government to Mexico and since have been used for various art projects. Double Life was created to commemorate the one year anniversary of the Japan earthquake and tsunami, and was dedicated with a ceremony on March 11, 2012. The imagery of Doble Vida consists of a background depicting the deep ocean overlaid with images of flowers and people in homage to what the tsunami took. It was sponsored by the Garros Galería in Mexico City, the Fundación Japón México and the Cuauhtémoc borough.

== See also ==
- Japanese community of Mexico City
