= Mitsuhide Tsuchida =

Paraguayan footballer

Personal information
- Full name: Mitsuhide Oishi Tsuchida
- Date of birth: 1978 (age 47–48)
- Place of birth: Pedro Juan Caballero, Paraguay

Youth career
- Sport Colombia

Senior career*
Years	Team	Apps	(Gls)
- 2 de Mayo
1989	Toa Kensetsu		
- Shonan Bellmare
1991	Cerro Corá		
- Independiente PJC
1993–1996	Ventforet Kofu		
- Nirasaki Astros

International career
- Paraguay U20
- * Club domestic league appearances and goals

Mitsuhide Oishi Tsuchida (born 1978 in Pedro Juan Caballero, Paraguay) is a former Japanese-Paraguayan professional football defender who played in Paraguay and Japan during the 1980s and 1990s.
