= Judgment Without Trial =

Book by Tetsuden Kashima

Judgment Without Trial: Japanese American Imprisonment During World War II
- Author: Tetsuden Kashima
- Publisher: University of Washington Press
- Publication date: 2003

Judgment Without Trial: Japanese American Imprisonment During World War II is a 2003 book by Tetsuden Kashima, published by the University of Washington Press. It discusses the internment of Japanese Americans in World War II.

== Background ==
The author and his family had been interned in World War II. Kashima, born in 1940, later served in the U.S. Army, and took a professorial post in the University of Washington, focusing on ethnicity in the United States. Nona Coates Smith of Bryn Mawr College wrote that "one understands the often passionate presentation of the topic", though she added that "Some bias does creep into" the work as a result.

The author had conducted interviews with people who were incarcerated in the camps.

== Contents ==
The book has ten chapters. In addition, it has a bibliography, flow charts of government processes, a map, a notes section, and tables. Nona Coates Smith criticized the lack of dates attached to notes and believed that the text should have contained internal notes instead of having the notes relegated to a dedicated section; she added that "Some of those notes add a unique perspective to the narrative on which they are expounding".

The author argues that the internment used various government agencies, so he felt it was counterproductive to limit focus to any particular agency or group of ethnic Japanese persons. He described the collective internment efforts from various government agencies as, in the words of Wendy Ng of San Jose State University, "a loosely structured meta-organization".

Kashima also used documents to support the assertion that American government officials had engaged in prior planning for war with Japan and possible measures against Japanese Americans. He added that anti-Japanese sentiment was an element. The chapter at the end summarizes the author's assertions in a manner described by Nona Coates Smith as "even-handed".

== Reception ==
Richard H. Minear in The Review of Politics concluded that the book is an "important contribution" with "meticulous" sourcing and a "judicious and "cool" tone. However, Minnear believes that if Kashima had formal backgrounds in the legal realm, the style of sections discussing legal processes would have been more convincing.

Kevin Allen Leonard of Western Washington University said that it was a "thoughtful interpretation of the imprisonment". He praised "painstaking research and his ambitious effort to describe the imprisonment in all its dimensions."

Both Minear and Leonard had some concerns with the book's organization. Minear argued that the index does not cover all of the topics and concepts seen in the notes section, and he believes some of the supplementary content was confusing. Leonard argued that the flow charts did not adequately inform the reader, and that due to the specialized vocabulary and nomenclature, "The ambitious scope of the book may make it difficult for non-experts to read."

Ng wrote that "Without a doubt, Kashima's study extends and deepens the understanding" of the subject.

Nona Coates Smith wrote that "Kashima's book will be of value to others who work in this and associated fields."

Geoffrey S. Smith of Queen's University wrote that the book had "good ground-level research", but criticized the editing, believing it needed to be "tougher", and he also felt there was only "suggestive circumstantial evidence" of the federal government making deliberate plans.
