= Garros Galería =

Garros Gallery
- Garros Galería
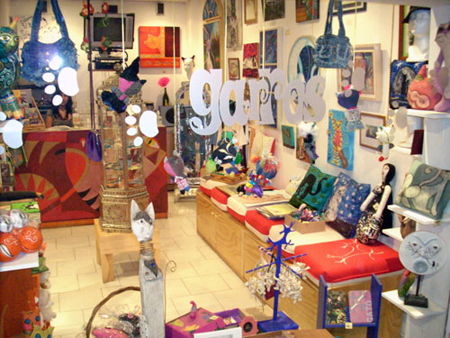
- View of the interior from outside window
- Established: 2006
- Location: Colonia Roma, Mexico City, Mexico
- Coordinates: 19°25′2.61″N 99°9′37.6″W
- Type: Art gallery
- Website: garrostodoengatos.com

Garros Galería or Garros Gallery is located in Colonia Roma in Mexico City. It is the only art gallery and museum dedicated to cats in Mexico.

== History ==
The enterprise was begun by siblings Joel and María del Carmen Nava Polina, along with Rodrigo Moreno González, who realized that there were cat museums in the United States, Canada and the Bahamas but not in Mexico. Both come from a family of cat lovers with fifteen cats between them currently. They had also built a large collection of cat-related items over the years. The gallery began in 2006 by gathering various artists and friends to donate and put works for the gallery on consignment. Since then, the gallery has had success because it caters to a niche market which had not been served previously. Sales have included those to Europe through the Internet.

Since it opened, the gallery has been featured on various television shows including TV Azteca and Once TV.

== Description ==
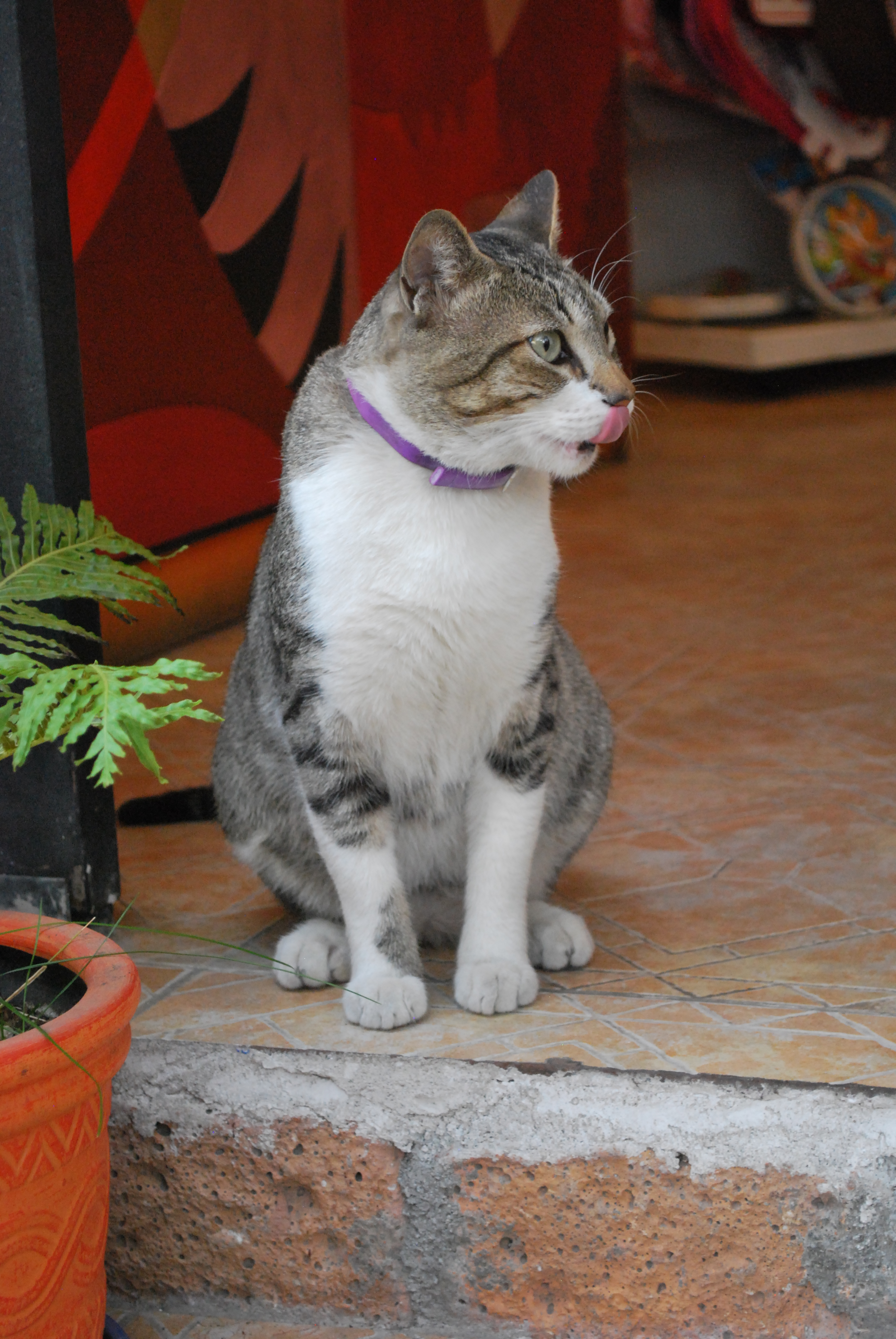
Fideo, resident cat of the gallery

It is located in Colonia Roma, which is known for having a large number of galleries, boutiques and specialty stores. Most of the gallery is dedicated to art and handcrafts with cat themes with the aim of supporting artists and artisans both from Mexico and abroad as well as promoting cats aesthetically. It works with over one hundred designers, artists and artisans to create its line of products. The catalog includes over 5,000 pieces which includes handcrafts, pillows, paintings, T-shirts, jewelry, cups, toys, photographs, watches and books. Prices range from twenty pesos for a lollipop and 45 pesos for earrings to over 8,000 for an oil painting. The merchandise focuses on original art and handcrafts, ensuring that customers are buying items available nowhere else and not buying knock offs or illegal copies of commercial products. Customers include cat aficionados or friends/family of such, curious people who pass by the site and tourists. Some of the creators who work with the gallery include Daniel Soler, Serioshka Hellmund, Roxana Elvridge-Thomas, Ricardo Ham, Karina Falcón, Iris México, Miguel Ángel Tenorio, Guillermo León, James Tomon and Ana Karen Allende.

The logo for the gallery is “El gato Dedrita” (Dedrita the cat) designed by Joel Nava Polina which represents the playful nature of cats and of their admirers.

The gallery also sponsors exhibitions and other events not related to cats but with the aim of promoting local artists. It has shown works by artists such as Jesús Topete, Fumiko Nakashima and Kodai Kita.

== Gato Sombra ==
The Gato Sombra is a painting of a cat which was owned by artist Odette Paz before it died. The painting has its own niche in the gallery where it is claimed by the artist and others to grant favors for those petitioners who believe in it. Petitioners write small notes to leave with the image. The gallery also sells small images with a prayer.

== Exhibitions ==
The gallery has a room dedicated to temporary art exhibits which are not necessarily related to cats. It specializes in work by up-and-coming artists, especially those from the Japanese community in Mexico City such as Fumiko Nakashima and Satoji Matoba.
