= The Japanese in Latin America =

2004 book by Daniel Masterson

- Author: Daniel Masterson; Sayaka Funada-Classen
- Language: English
- Series: The Asian American Experience
- Subject: Japanese diaspora in Latin America
- Genre: Essay, Investigation
- Published: 2004
- Publication place: United States
- Pages: 335
- ISBN: 978-0-252-07144-7
- OCLC: 423802919

The Japanese in Latin America is a 2004 book published by the University of Illinois Press about Japanese Latin Americans. The author is Daniel Masterson, while Sayaka Funada-Classen gave research assistance related to the Japanese language. The book discusses all of the major Japanese populations in Latin America and some other groups of Japanese diaspora who are not as well known. The Japanese populations of Argentina, Bolivia, Brazil, Chile, Colombia, Paraguay, Peru and Uruguay in South America, Cuba and the Dominican Republic in the Caribbean, Central America, and Mexico are all discussed in this book.

Most of the book is devoted to the histories of these groups, and it also has information on the current states of these communities as of 2004. The book uses primary sources, oral histories, and secondary sources. In addition, Masterson included his own archival research and his own interviews. Most of his archives came from the United States while some came from Mexico and Peru. The book uses sources written in English, Japanese, Portuguese, and Spanish. This book is a part of "The Asian American Experience" series edited by Roger Daniels.

Takeyuki (Gaku) Tsuda of the University of California, San Diego, who reviewed the book, described it in 2004 as "the most comprehensive overview of the Japanese diaspora in Latin America to date." Ayumi Takenaka of Bryn Mawr College, who also reviewed the book, wrote that "This book is the first attempt to cover Japanese immigration to different Latin American countries".

Jeffrey Lesser from Emory University, a reviewer of this book, wrote that the book is useful both for Caribbean and Latin American scholars and for scholars of ethnic studies of the United States. Lesser stated that the book is useful for the former because Latin American and Caribbean scholars "have traditionally treated race and ethnicity as a simple matter of black and white" while for the latter, The Japanese in Latin America has "its careful exploration of why diasporic experiences are not limited to the United States".

== Overview ==
The Japanese in Latin America has chronological narration, with sections devoted to certain time periods: the early 20th Century, World War II to 1949, and 1950 onwards. The book also uses geographical narration, or dividing the narrations by country. Stephanie C. Moore of the University of California, San Diego, another reviewer, stated that the book "is more a historical survey than a comparative analysis" and therefore the book "is able to explore a wide range of topics". Takenaka stated that the book is "largely descriptive" and has "little analysis of how it happened and why." Moore stated that because "of the uneven nature of the literature upon which he relies" the depth of the coverage of the topics in each country differs.

The book discusses how Japanese people immigrated to Latin America and how they adapted to living in their new countries. The book chronicles the lives of their descendants. The book has an account of Nikkei people who, since the late 1980s, had moved to Japan to take manual jobs that pay more money than jobs they could find in their home countries.

Takenaka stated that the work has "Throughout the book, there is more detailed information on Peru than on any other country". Lesser stated that because of the research interests of the author, Masterson, "it is not surprising" that there is so much focus on Peru. Lesser argues that the decision to focus on Peru was a "smart choice" partly because "work on Japanese-Peruvians is much more modest than on Brazil".

=== Contents ===
The book has a total of nine chapters. The first chapter is about early Japanese immigration to the United States, Canada, and Hawaii. The second chapter discusses Japanese society in the 1800s, including the Meiji Era, and beyond up until the signing of the 1908 gentleman's agreement between the United States and Japan, which restricted Japanese immigration. With the United States out of reach, Japanese immigrants began immigrating to Latin America, and the second chapter also discusses the first wave of Japanese immigration to Latin America. The third chapter discusses the Latin American communities formed between 1908 and 1937 that were among the larger ones in Latin America. The focus is given on those in Brazil, Mexico, and Peru. Those in Brazil, Mexico, and Peru discussed in this chapter belonged to the first and second generations. Chapter four discusses the Japanese communities formed between 1908 and 1938 in Argentina, Bolivia, Colombia, Chile, and Paraguay in South America, as well as Cuba and Central America. Those communities were among the smaller ones in Latin America. The fifth chapter discusses the impact of World War II on the Japanese communities of Latin America, covering the years 1938 to 1952.

The sixth chapter discusses specifically the Japanese Peruvians during the World War II period. This is the sole single country-specific chapter. Chapter 6 has a focus on Japanese Peruvians deported from Peru and forced to be imprisoned in U.S. internment camps. The sources used in this chapter were archives and oral histories. Takenaka stated that this was "it is unclear if and to what extent an extensive field research was conducted, especially since there is no detailed description of authors’ methods." The United States government never made reparation payments to or an official apology for the ethnic Japanese Peruvians living in the United States, and that is the other reason why Lesser believed the focus on Peru was a "smart choice". Takenaka described the subject matter as "a largely unknown story". Lesser stated that Asian American studies and ethnic studies courses would find the discussion of legal proceedings related to Japanese-Peruvians who were interned "particularly useful".

The post-World War II Japanese populations are the subject of the final three chapters. The seventh chapter discusses existing Japanese communities and new Japanese settlements in South America between 1952 and 1970. The chapter includes information on post-World War II Japanese settlement in Argentina, Bolivia, and Paraguay. The immigrants, mostly from Okinawa, settled agricultural settlements, or colonias. The chapter also includes information on return migration. The eighth chapter discusses second and third-generation Japanese, called nikkei-jin, in Brazil, Mexico, and Peru. It also discusses those who went to Japan for economic reasons. Chapter 9 discusses the present-day Japanese communities in Latin America. Tsuda stated that the chapter on contemporary Japanese communities in Latin America "is mainly filled with factual and census survey data." In the final chapter, over half of the pages discuss Japanese Peruvians.

== Reception ==
Lesser stated that the book has "quality" in "providing a strong sense of the diversity of the Japanese and Nikkei experiences throughout Latin America" and that two "small issues", the use of terms such as "homeland" in a manner that may be "imprecise" to specialists of diaspora studies and ethnic history, and the possibility that specialists in specific national histories of Latin American countries "will quibble with some of the specifics in each of the chapters", "do not take away from the quality".

Takenaka argued that the book "lacks a sharp focus", that it should have more extensively used the field data, and that "the book would have been strengthened by focusing on a number of issues addressed sporadically throughout the book." However she stated that the author did a "good job in synthesizing the vast amount of multilingual sources" since it is "a challenging task to systematically analyze immigration to multiple countries", and that the book "successfully provides a general account of its topic". She wrote that "In particular, the book’s wide geographic and historical coverage and extensive use of sources make it a useful tool for beginning researchers." Tsuda wrote that the book "very impressive in geographical and historical scope but remains somewhat lacking in penetrating comparative analysis and explanation." Moore stated that "reading is at points choppy as Masterson hurls the reader back and forth through time and across the globe" and that "Masterson does not arrive at any revelatory new conclusions", the book is "thought-provoking for the specialist and generalist alike" and that the "thoroughness" of the book "is waiting to encourage cross-country analyses in the study of Asian Americans that will add depth and nuance to forthcoming scholarship."

Michelle J. Moran-Taylor of the University of Denver stated that despite "minor drawback"[s], "on the whole, the authors' exploration of the similarities and differences among the larger and smaller Japanese communities in Latin America and across time provides a thorough understanding of this particular immigrant experience." Rosana Barbosa of Saint Mary's University in Halifax, Nova Scotia stated that "the book is a relevant contribution to the study of immigration to Latin America, and of the Japanese's cultural, economic, and political contributions on several Latin American countries." Carl Mosk of the University of Victoria stated that "there is no doubt that all future students of Japanese migration will want to read this volume, drawing upon its colourful vignettes and its elaborately woven account of how international diplomacy and warfare refashioned the aspirations of Japan’s prewar emigrants." Evelyn Hu-DeHart of the Pacific Historical Review wrote that the book "reads nicely as a historical narrative", and that it was "a thorough overview and highly readable narrative history". She argued that "the absence of a good bibliography" which lists published primary and secondary sources alphabetically and detailing unpublished primary sources, including archival resources, is the "most frustrating" detail. In addition, she believes that there are many terminologies from other languages in the text so that the glossary "could also be more comprehensive". Also Hu-Dehart argued that the index does not have countries that the work does not focus on and therefore is not complete.

== See also ==
- Japan–Latin America relations
