= Japanese Mexicans =

Ethnic minority in Mexico

Mexicanos japoneses (Spanish) 日系メキシコ人 (Japanese)

Total population
- c. 76,000; 10,143 (October 2022)

Regions with significant populations
- Mexico City, Bajío Region, Chiapas, Sinaloa, Baja California, Sonora, State of Mexico, Coahuila, Veracruz, Oaxaca, Puebla

Languages
- Predominantly Mexican Spanish; Japanese

Religion
- Predominantly Roman Catholicism (90%); Minority Buddhism and Shintoism^{Note}

Related ethnic groups
- Other Asian Latin Americans
- Note: Religious classification is for Mexicans of Japanese descent and does not include recent immigrants.

Japanese Mexicans are Mexican citizens of Japanese descent. Organized Japanese immigration to Mexico occurred in the 1890s with the foundation of a coffee-growing colony in the state of Chiapas. Although this initiative failed, it was followed by greater immigration from 1900 to the beginning of World War II. However, it never reached the levels of Japanese immigration to the Americas such as Brazil or the United States.

Immigration halted during World War II and many Japanese nationals and even some naturalized Mexican citizens of Japanese origin were forced to relocate from communities in Baja California, Sinaloa, and Chiapas to Mexico City and other areas in the interior until the war was over. After the war, immigration began again, mostly due to Japanese companies investing in Mexico and sending over skilled employees.

== History ==
=== Early history ===
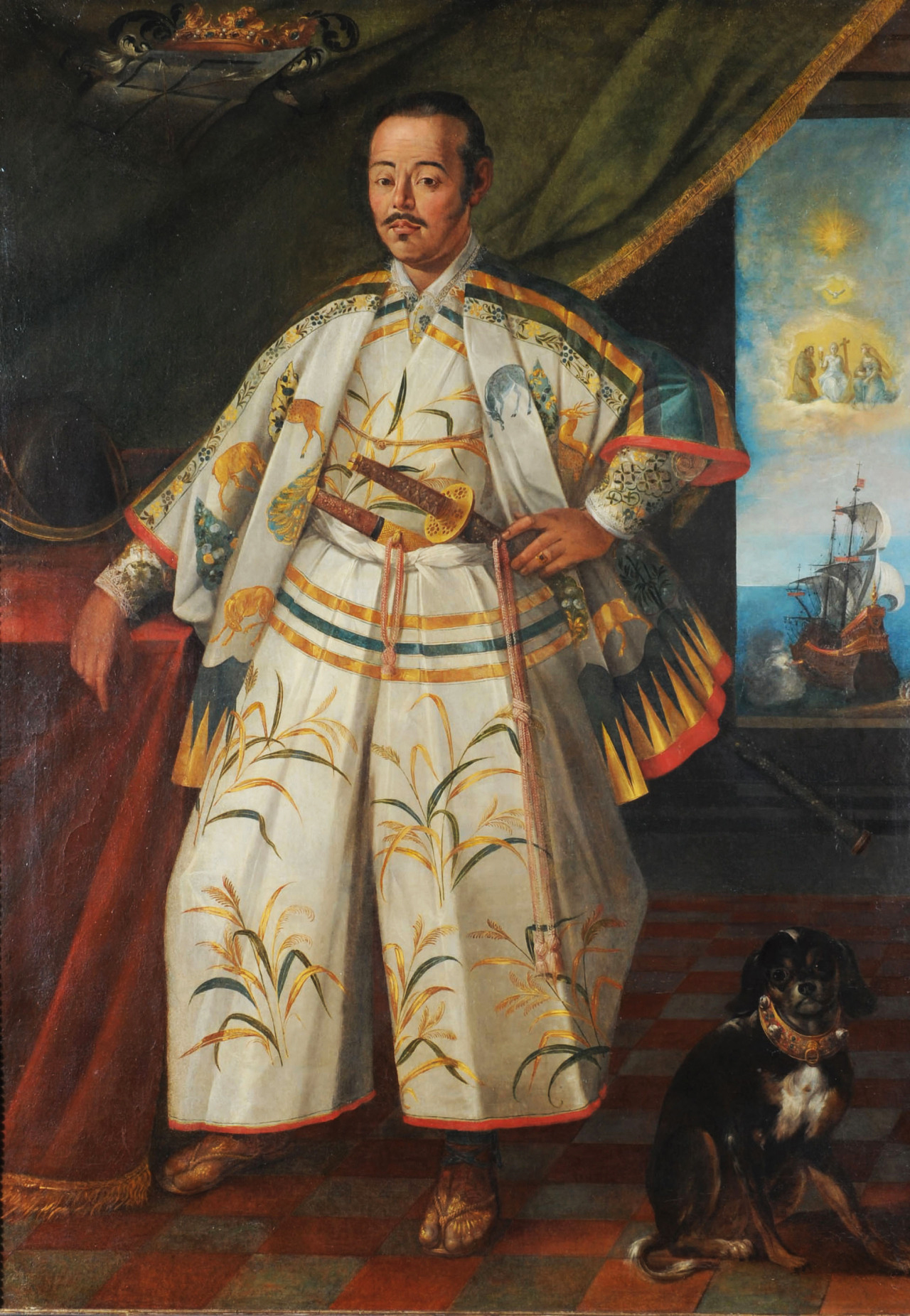
Hasekura Tsunenaga, the samurai who led the Japanese delegation to Mexico in 1613.

In the years 1613 through 1620, several diplomatic missions occurred on behalf of Japan to the Vatican, traveling through New Spain (arriving in Acapulco and departing from Veracruz) and visiting various ports of call in Europe. Although the final destination was not Mexico, this mission is viewed as the beginning of Japan–Mexico relations. They were led by Hasekura Tsunenaga, who was accompanied by more than one hundred Japanese Christians and merchants; as well as twenty-two samurai under the shōgun Tokugawa Ieyasu. A fight occurred in 1614 in which a Japanese samurai stabbed a Spanish soldier, Sebastián Vizcaíno. This was witnessed and recorded by historian Chimalpahin, who was the grandson of an Aztec nobleman. Some of Tsunega's delegation would stay and marry the local Mexicans.

Japanese were among the Asian slaves who were shipped from the Spanish Philippines in the Manila-Acapulco galleons to Acapulco. These slaves were all called "Chino", which meant Chinese. They were of diverse origins, including Japanese, Koreans, Malays, Filipinos, Javanese, Timorese, and people from Bengal, India, Ceylon, Makassar, Tidore, Terenate, and China. Filipinos made up most of their population. The people in this community of diverse Asians in Mexico was called "los indios chinos" by the Spanish. Most of these slaves were male and were obtained from Portuguese slave traders who obtained them from Portuguese colonial possessions and outposts of the Estado da India, which included parts of India, Bengal, Malacca, Indonesia, Nagasaki in Japan, and Macau. Spain received some of these Chino slaves from Mexico, where owning a Chino slave showed high status. Records of three Japanese slaves dating from the 16th century, named Gaspar Fernandes, Miguel and Ventura who ended up in Mexico showed that they were purchased by Portuguese slave traders in Japan, brought to Manila from where they were shipped to Mexico by their owner Perez. Some of these Asian slaves were also brought to Lima in Peru, where there was a small community of Asians made out of Chinese, Japanese, Filipinos, Malays, and others.

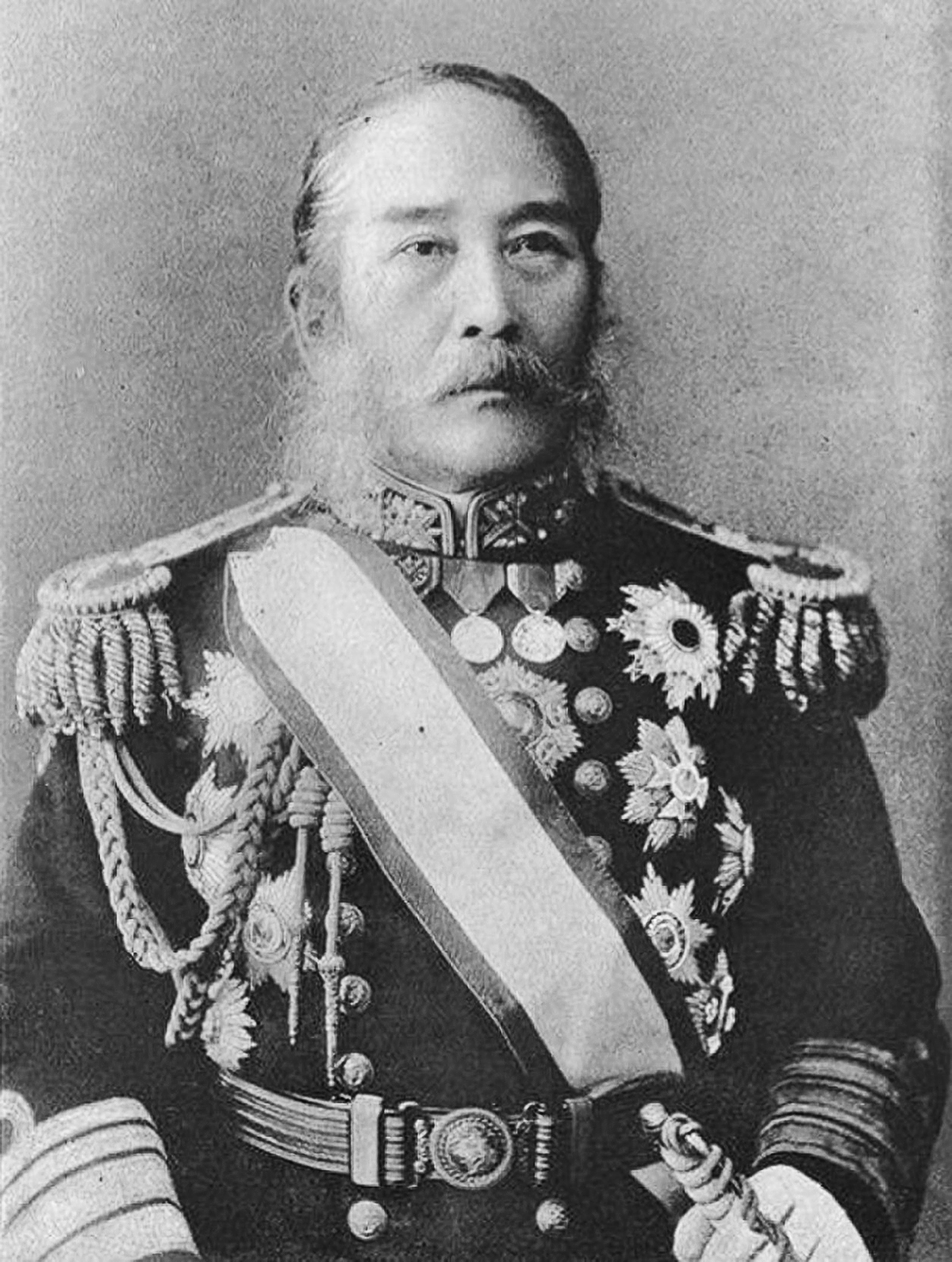
Enomoto Takeaki, founder of the Japanese colony in Chiapas

The history of modern Japanese migration begins near the end of the 19th century. In 1868, Japanese isolation from the world was broken which prompted large scale social and economic upheaval, with the Japanese government encouraging emigration. These emigrants included those from Okinawa, who fled oppression by the Japanese government after the island was taken over in 1878.

Mexico was the first country to recognize Japanese sovereignty after the end of its isolation, signing a treaty with it in 1888 to allow citizens of both countries the ability to travel to the other and establishing consulates. Mexico was the first Latin American country to receive Japanese immigrants in 1897, with the first thirty five arriving to Chiapas under the auspices of Viscount Enomoto Takeaki, with the permission of Mexican president Porfirio Díaz. These first Japanese communities mostly consisted of farm workers and other laborers. Japanese authorities were interested in creating a coffee plantation in Chiapas, for export to Japan. They established the Sociedad Colonizadora Japón-México to recruit Japanese farmers to migrate with government support to obtain land. Others went without government assistance and were called “free emigrants” able to buy land without obligation to the Japanese government. However, economic conditions in Chiapas forced many immigrants to abandon their contracts with the Japanese government and, under the leadership of Terui Ryojiro, instead formed a new organization called the Sociedad Cooperativa Nichiboku Kyodo Gaisha which allowed them to diversify their economic activities. The very first settlement was based on coffee production but failed for various reasons including the fact that not all of the colonists were farmers and many became sick with tropical diseases. Many from this colony dispersed but there remains a small Japanese community in Acacoyagua, Chiapas. However, its establishment marks the first Japanese immigration to Latin America.

=== 1900 to World War II ===
Most of the immigration to Mexico occurred from 1900 to the beginning of World War II. Many of the immigrants in the first half of the 20th century were skilled laborers or illegal immigrants. Mexico Japan relations were superficial in the latter 19th to mid 20th century but immigrants to Mexico had favorable treatment, as Mexico needed additional workers for modernization efforts.

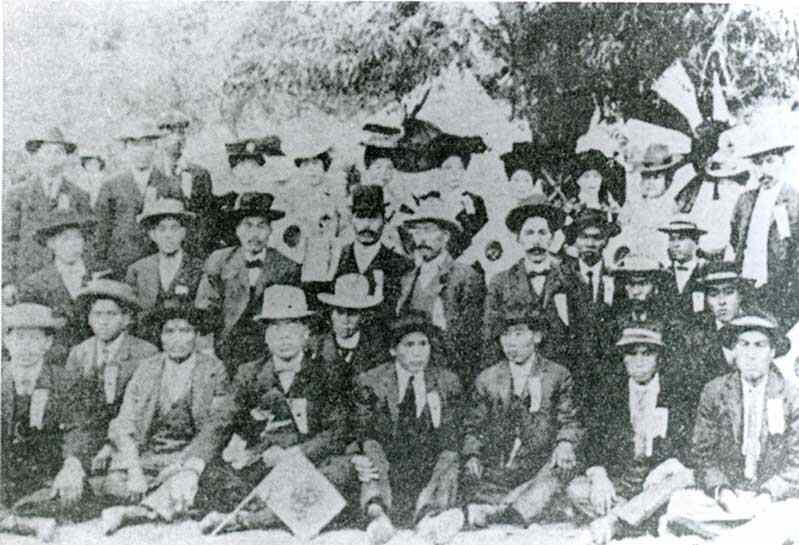
Japanese immigrant workers at the mine of Cananea, Sonora in the 1910s.

In the first decade of the 20th century, a large number of Japanese immigrants came as workers contracted to companies doing business in the country which needed skilled labor. This was first in the mining and sugar cane industries and later in construction and railroads. The main Japanese companies involved in this were Kumamoto, Toyo and Tairiku Shokumin Kaisha which did business in mining and agriculture. The three companies sent a total of 530 people to Mexico between 1904 and 1907. However, many of the immigrants could not do the hard labor of the mines and sugar cane fields, prompting them to abandon their contracts, heading to California or even Cuba. During this time period, the number of people of Japanese background went down in Mexico.

In 1908, Japan and Mexico informally agreed to end immigration by contract, but “free” immigrants continued to come. From 1914 to 1938, another 291 people immigrated to Mexico from Japan. Legal skilled laborers after 1917 often worked in the health fields, along with those Japanese invited by the Japanese community in Mexico. Most of these were in Baja California where the economic development was greatest. A number of other Japanese came to the country illegally from the United States, after being rejected by this country, coming to Mexico hoping to enter the U.S. again. These were mostly concentrated in the north of Mexico and those who could not re-enter the United States stayed in Mexico permanently.

Significant Japanese immigration into the Ensenada, Baja California area took place between 1920 and 1940 with only two known Japanese residents before that. Ensenada, Rosarito and Mexicali attracted Japanese immigrants, legal and illegal. The number of Japanese by 1940 was about 300, most of whom worked in farming and fishing. Japanese fishing enterprises included the capture of lobster and mollusks. A significant portion of Japanese agricultural production was exported to the United States and even led to a Japanese-owned chili pepper dehydration facility for the same purpose.

Before World War II, the highest concentrations of Japanese and Japanese descent were in Baja California, followed by Mexico City and Sonora. Most worked in fishing and agriculture followed by non-professional workers, commerce, professionals and technicians. Up until the war, the treatment of Japanese in the country and their descendants had been favorable, very different than the treatment of Chinese in the country, which suffered discrimination and even expulsion in the early 20th century. The Japanese were relatively free from discrimination in Mexico, unlike the United States, Brazil and other countries in the Americas. One reason for this is that the Japanese population was not as prominent as the Chinese one in numbers and the work that they did, which included the construction of factories, bridges and other infrastructure was viewed favorably. The Japanese were not considered to be foreign exploiters, rather partners in Mexico's development because of their technical skills in fields such as medicine and engineering.

In Chiapas, where the earliest Japanese immigration occurred in the prior century, intermarriage was common, breaking down ethnic barriers. This has led to the end of a distinct Japanese population in the state, leaving only family names as a reminder. The official census of 1940s counts only 1,550 Japanese nationals in the country, the overwhelming majority men, although other studies put the number higher, as many as over 6,000. Even with the 6,000 figure, it pales against the number of Japanese in other countries in the Americas at the time such as the United States (285,000), Brazil (205,000), Canada (22,000) and Peru (18,000) .

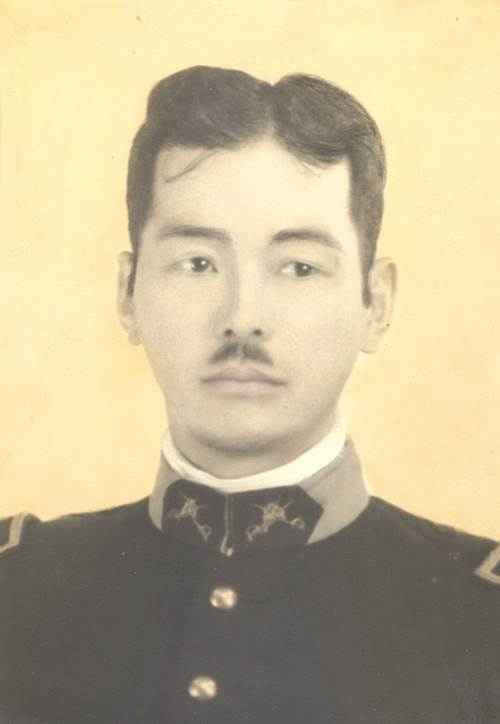
Kingo Nonaka was a combat medic during the Mexican Revolution and later a documentary photographer of Tijuana. Nonaka was the head of Pancho Villa's personal medical squadron in the Northern Division. He would later fall in love and marry a Mexican woman.

Japanese immigration halted by World War II to near zero, and those who were in the country were faced with restrictions and relocation after Mexico broke diplomatic ties with Japan in 1941. Japanese nationals and even those with naturalized Mexican citizenship were forced to move from areas along the Pacific coast such as Baja California, Sinaloa and Chiapas inland, with some forced into exile to Japan. The goal was to keep the Japanese in Mexico away from ports and from Mexico's border with the United States so that they could not be used as a “fifth column” by the Japanese government.

Japanese nationals were forced to move to interior cities such as Puebla, Guadalajara and Cuernavaca. Most went to Mexico City and Guadalajara but there were concentrations in Guanajuato and Querétaro. It is estimated that about 1,100 people moved to Mexico City and Guadalajara alone. The Japanese community worked to buy properties to house the displaced including the former Temixco Hacienda near Cuernavaca which allowed the Japanese there to grow crops and live semi-independently. The fear of Japanese-Mexicans faded during the war, with some allowed to go back home before 1945 and the rest after.

Mexico was one of a number of countries to take this action, but in the end only about 3,500 people were affected as opposed to 120,000 in the United States. With some exceptions, those forcibly relocated were allowed to return after the war and retake possession of their property. However, in a number of cases, this proved impossible as people created new lives in the central states and/or they lost farming land and/or water rights to the unscrupulous. Those most able to return to their old life were the fishermen of the Ensenada area. This treatment of the Japanese is not in most accounts of Mexican history and is not taught in schools.

One consequence of the war was that it caused many Japan-born to remain in Mexico, even if they had plans to one day return to Japan. The main reason for this was that the war completely destroyed the old Japan, and what they knew no longer existed. After the war, there was a strong division among the Japanese-Mexican community as to whether Japan had really lost the war, (with about ten percent refusing to believe Japan could lose). However, the division was enough to keep the Japanese-Mexicans from seeking restitution from the Mexican government or promote the memory of the displacement.

=== Postwar to 1978 ===
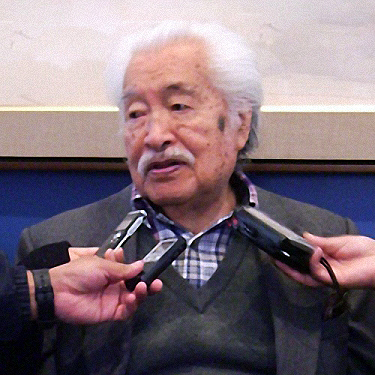
Luis Nishizawa Mexican artist.

After the end of the war, Japanese immigration to Mexico began again. From 1951 to 1978, this immigration was associated with Japan's economic growth, giving it money to invest abroad. From the 1950s to the present, over three hundred Japanese enterprises have established themselves in Mexico and Japan is Mexico's third largest trading partner. These companies brought highly skilled workers into the country, usually on two-year renewable visas.

Since Japanese immigration began, it was a small and dispersed phenomenon, with few to no formal policies or support to Japanese immigrants. Shortly before the war, many Japanese in Mexico began to form associations called “nijonjinkai” (Japanese associations) or “kenjinkai” (associations of people from the same prefecture). However, before the war, there was no nationwide Japanese immigrant organization similar to those in the United States. The closest organization to this function was the “kyoeikai” which arose in response to the displacement of Japanese during WWII, especially in Mexico City. Later, the leaders of these organizations would form the Asociación México Japonesa, which remains today.

== Mexicans of Japanese descent and current immigration ==
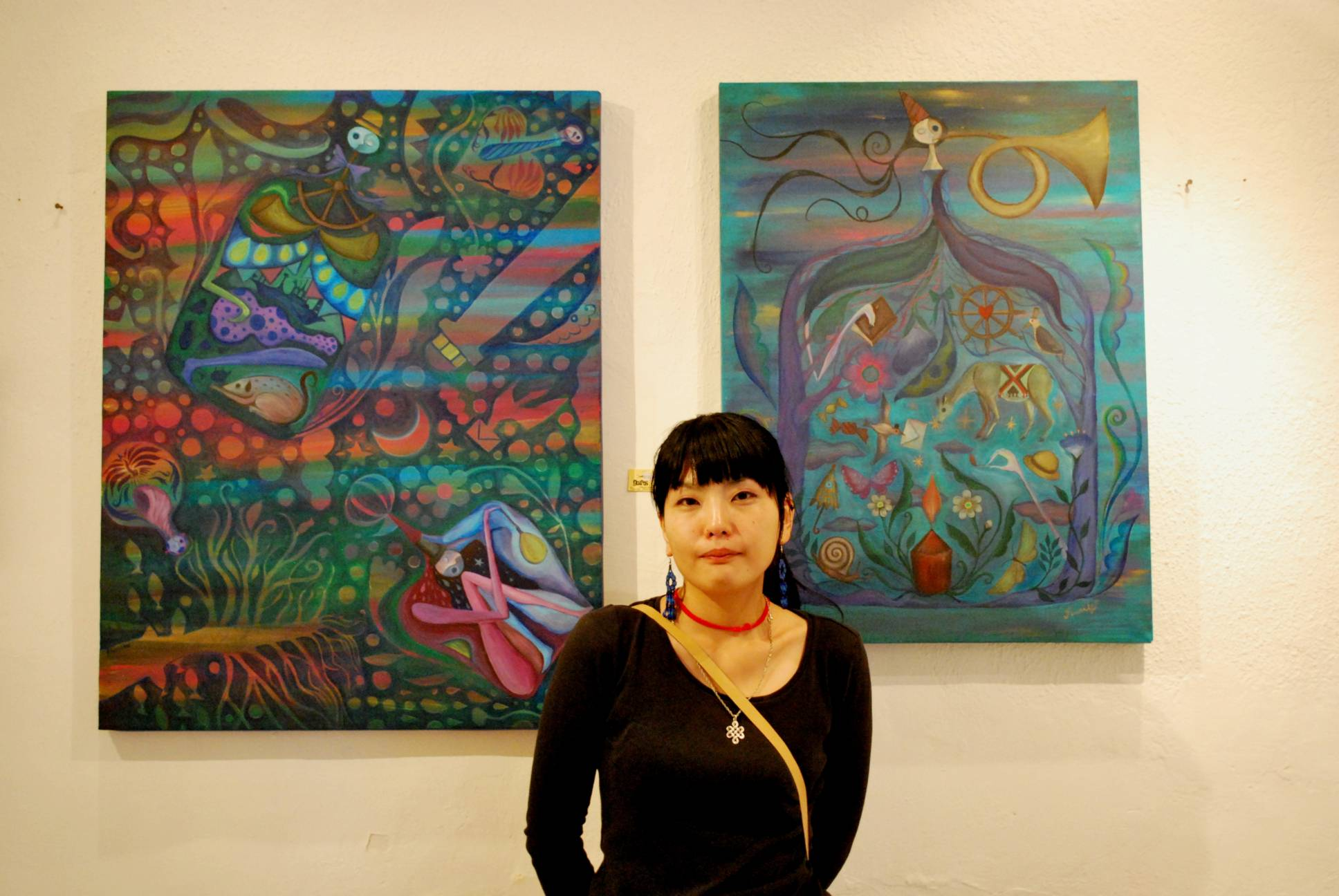
Japanese artist Fumiko Nakashima with two of her works at the Garros Galería in Mexico City

In 1997, descendants of Japanese immigrants celebrated a century of Japanese immigration into Mexico, with an estimated 30,000 people of Japanese nationality or ethnicity living in Mexico. Despite the immigration starting in the latter 19th century, it never reached the numbers it did in other countries such as the United States and Brazil. Japanese immigrant influence is strongest in Baja California, and can be seen in both the last names of many of its residents and the operators of maquiladoras near the U.S. border. There are still scattered communities of Japanese descendants from the first half of the 20th century in other areas. In addition to the Asociación México Japonesa, there are some regional Japanese associations such as the Asociación Japonesa del Sur de Veracruz established in 1996.

There has been little research into this ethnic group in Mexico. The main researcher is María Elena Ota Mishima who has written various works on the topic, including the book Siete Migraciones Japoneses en México 1890–1978.

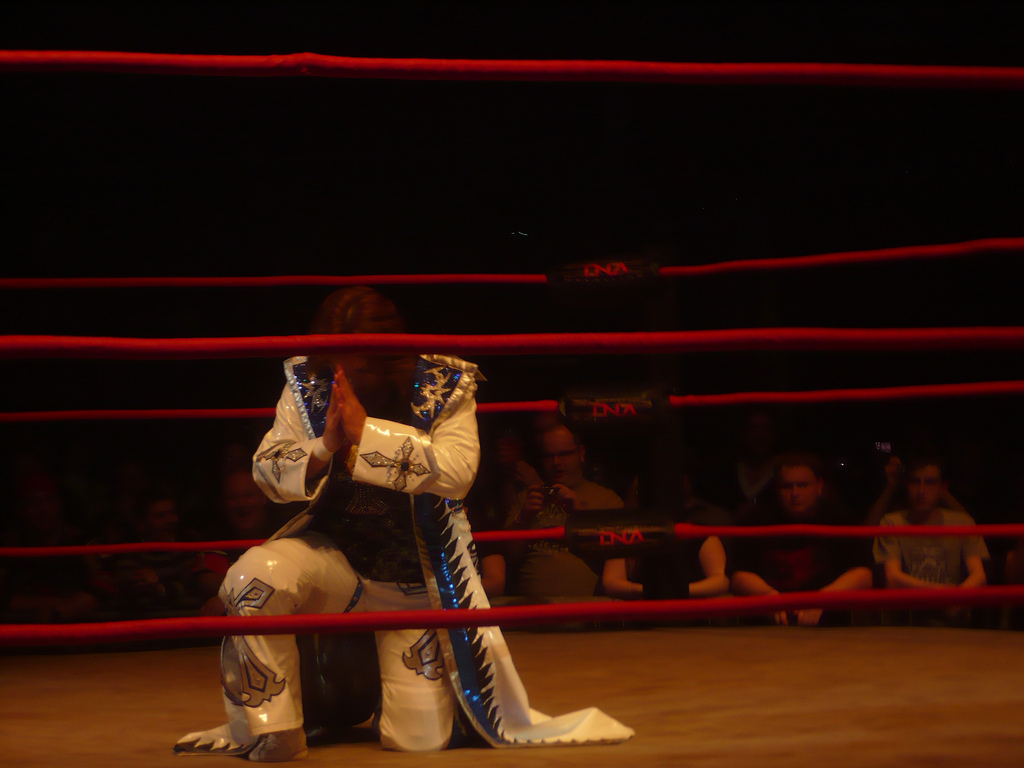
Ayako Hamada

There has been one notable influx of Japanese into Mexico since 1978, which is young artists from Japan who have settled mostly in Mexico City. They have come because they have found it easier to develop their careers in Mexico, as the art market in Japan is very small and very hard to break into. More people in Mexico visit museums than in Japan and the range of artistic styles is much less restricted in Mexico. In 2011, the Museo Universitario del Chopo held an exhibition called Selva de cristal: artistas japoneses en México to promote the work of artists from Japan and Japanese descent in Mexico. Artists represented included Luis Nishizawa, Kiyoshi Takahasi, Carlos Nakatani, Kyuichi Yahai and Kiyoto Ota.

Notable Japanese and Japanese-Mexicans include theater promoter Seki Sano, painters Tamiji and Tawaja and Luis Nishizawa. Tanetoshi Kirawawa founded one of the most successful Japanese businesses in Mexico, and is also known for his philanthropic work such as the publication of books and magazines about Japan including Japónica and the creation of institutions such as Liceo Mexicano-Japonés, with teaches both Japanese and Mexican children, as well as the Japan study program of the Colegio de la Frontera Norte.

=== Centers of Japanese population ===
As a result of Japanese investment in automotive and associated industries, there has been a significant influx of Japanese immigrants to the Bajío region. The largest increase has been in Guanajuato, which has seen a 400% increase in Japanese residents since 2013. The opening of Honda and Toyota plants in Celaya and a Mazda plant in Salamanca greatly increased the Japanese presence. As a result, branches of Japanese banks as well as the first Japanese consulate-general in Mexico have opened in León.

Other centers of Japanese population include:

- Mexico City, while there is no specific area with a Japanese diaspora, there are many Japanese and Japanese descent people that live in the city. The city has schools mainly for Japanese Mexicans with the part-time school Chuo Gakuen, and the adult school Instituto Cultural Mexicano-Japonés.
- Acacoyagua, Chiapas, the city is home to the first colonial settlement of Japanese immigrants who tried to start their own colony. Since its inception, the city is still home to long practiced Japanese customs and people of Japanese descent. Prominent Japanese people have also visited the town including the Japanese prince.
- Guadalajara, while not as prominent as other regions, the Japanese community in Guadalajara is steadily increasing and growing thanks in part to its geographical location.

== Education ==
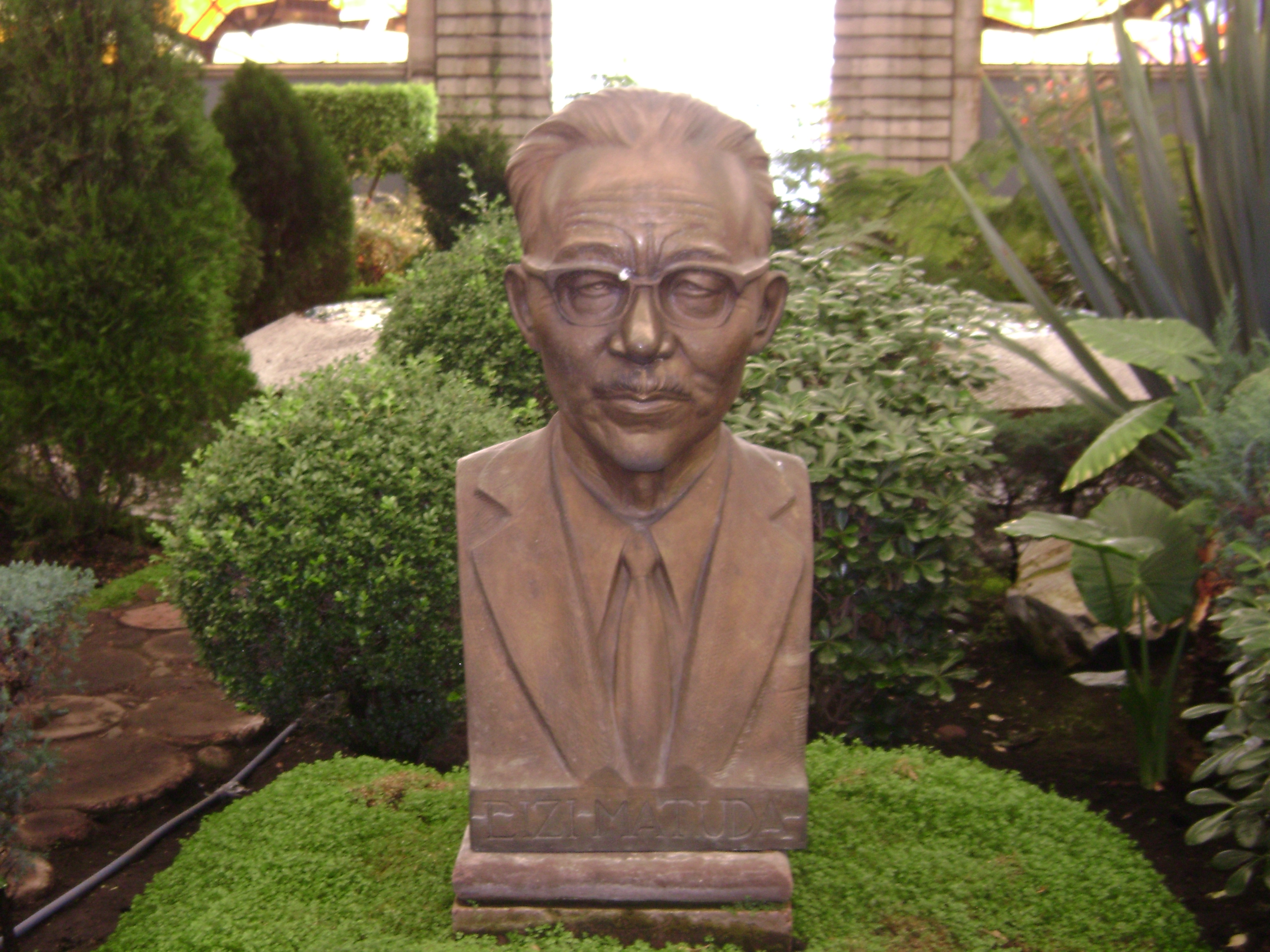
Eizi Matuda

Locations of Japanese international schools, day and supplementary, in Mexico recognized by MEXT

The Liceo Mexicano Japonés is located in Mexico City. As of 1983 some Nikkei families living in other Mexican states have their children move to Mexico City and live with their relatives so they can attend this school.

In addition, the Escuela Japonesa de Aguascalientes (アグアスカリエンテス日本人学校 Aguasukarientesu Nihonjin Gakkō), an overseas Japanese school, is in Aguascalientes, Aguascalientes. As of 2013 it has 59 primary school students and 13 junior high school students for a total of 72 students.

Part-time Japanese schools include the Colegio Japones de Guadalajara A.C. (グアダラハラ補習授業校 Guadarahara Hoshū Jugyō Kō) in Zapopan, Jalisco and the Asociacion Regiomontana de Lengua Japonesa A.C. (モンテレー補習授業校 Monterē Hoshū Jugyō Kō) in San Pedro Garza García, Nuevo León. Colegio Japones de Guadalajara is held at Secundaria y Preparatoria Femenil Colinas de San Javier. Formerly it had its classes held at the Escuela Primaria "Antonio Caso" in Guadalajara. Asociacion Regiomontana was previously based in Apodaca.

== Literature ==
A novel Mudas las Garzas by Selfa A. Chew is based on the oral histories of Japanese Mexicans in the middle of the 20th century.

== See also ==
- Acacoyagua Municipality, Chiapas
- Japanese community of Mexico City
- Japan–Mexico relations
- Mexicans in Japan
