= Asian Latin Americans =

Latin Americans of Asian descent

Latinoamericanos asiáticos

Total population
- c. 7,000,000 approximately

Regions with significant populations
- Brazil: 3,000,000 (self-identified East Asian ancestry)
- Peru: 2,700,000 estimated 36,841 self-reported
- Mexico: 1,000,000
- Venezuela: 500,000
- Argentina: 344,130
- Colombia: 213,910
- Panama: 140,000
- Cuba: 114,240
- Dominican Republic: 52,000
- Paraguay: 51,000
- Guatemala: 27,000
- Chile: 25,000
- Ecuador: 17,080
- Bolivia: 15,000
- Nicaragua: 14,000
- Costa Rica: 9,170
- Puerto Rico: 6,390
- Uruguay: 4,000
- El Salvador: 3,271 (self-reported; 20,000 estimated)
- Honduras: 2,609

Languages
- European Languages: Spanish · Portuguese · English; Asian Languages: Chinese · Japanese · Korean · Filipino · Vietnamese · Thai · Malay · Arabic · Hindustani · Tamil · Telugu · Punjabi · Bengali

Religion
- Christianity · Buddhism · Taoism · Shintoism · Islam · Zoroastrianism · Hinduism · Sikhism · Jainism

Related ethnic groups
- Latino, Hispanic, Asian, Filipinos, Spaniards, Portuguese, European Latin Americans, Asian Hispanic and Latino Americans, Latin American Asian, Asian Caribbean, Chinese Caribbean people

Asian Latin Americans (sometimes Asian-Latinos) are Latin Americans of Asian descent. Asian immigrants to Latin America have largely been from East Asia or West Asia. Historically, Asians in Latin America have a centuries-long history in the region, starting with Filipinos in the 16th century. The peak of Asian immigration occurred in the 19th and 20th centuries. There are currently more than four million Asian Latin Americans, nearly 1% of Latin America's population. Chinese, Japanese, and Lebanese are the largest Asian ancestries; other major ethnic groups include Filipinos, Syrians, Koreans and Indians, many of whom are Indo-Caribbean and came from neighboring countries in the Caribbean and the Guianas. Brazil is home to the largest population of East Asian descent, estimated at 2.08 million. The country is also home to a large percentage of West Asian descendants. With as much as 5% of their population having some degree of Chinese ancestry, Peru and Mexico have the highest ratio of any country for East Asian descent. Though the most recent official census, which relied on self-identification, gave a much lower percentage.

There has been notable emigration from these communities in recent decades, so that there are now hundreds of thousands of people of Asian Latin American origin in both Japan and the United States.

== History ==
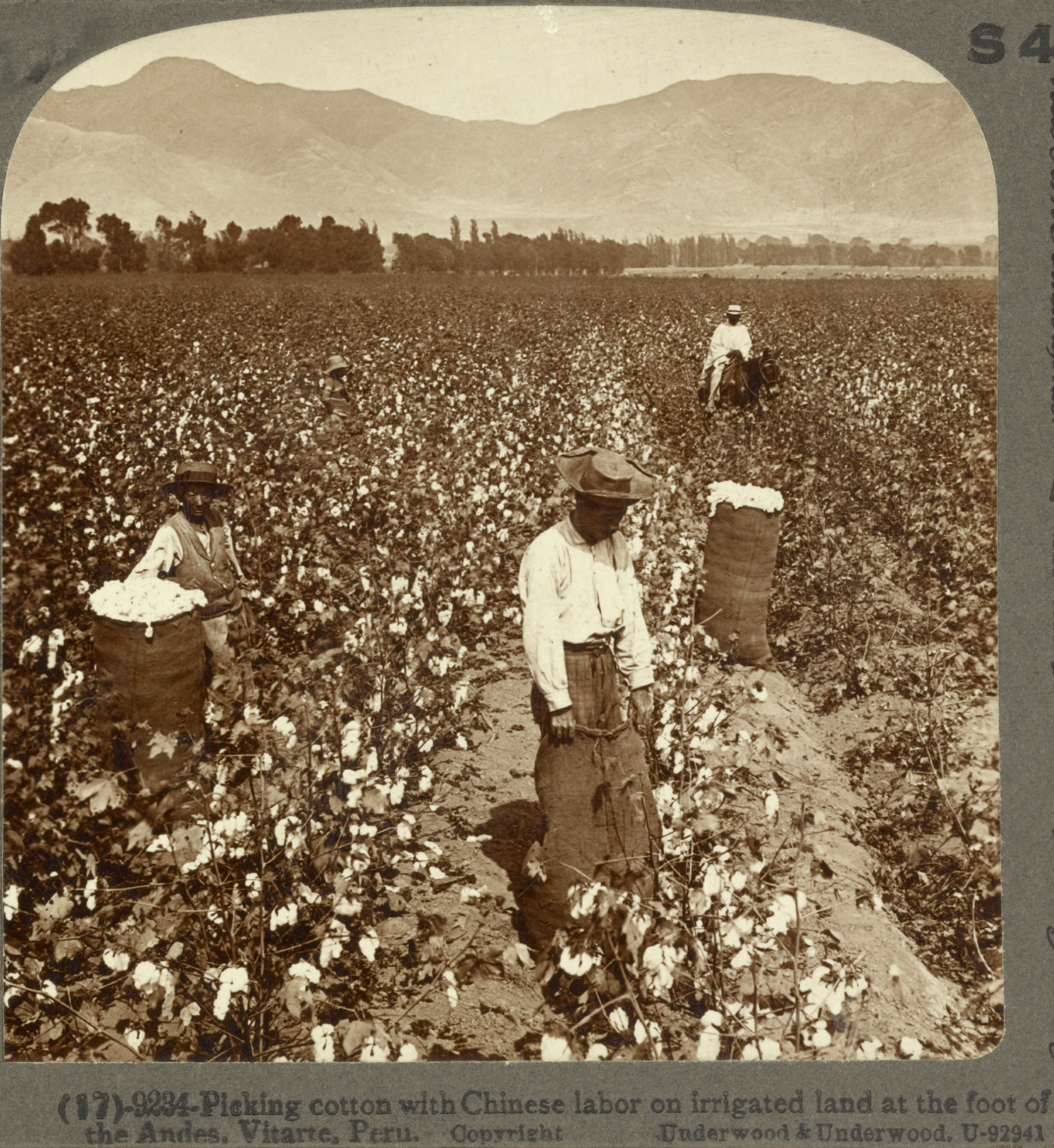
Chinese immigrants working in the cotton crop (1890) in Peru.

The first Asian Latin Americans were Filipinos who made their way to Latin America (primarily to Cuba and Mexico and secondarily to Argentina, Colombia, Panama and Peru) in the 16th century, as slaves, crew members, and prisoners during the Spanish colonial rule of the Philippines through the Viceroyalty of New Spain, with its capital in Mexico City. For two and a half centuries (between 1565 and 1815) many Filipinos and Chinese sailed on the Manila-Acapulco Galleons, assisting in the Spanish Empire's monopoly in trade. Some of these sailors never returned to the Philippines and many of their descendants can be found in small communities around Baja California, Sonora, Mexico City, Peru and others, thus making Filipinos the oldest Asian ethnic group in Latin America.

While South Asians had been present in various forms in Latin America for centuries by the 1800s, it was in this century that the flow into the region spiked dramatically. This rapid influx of hundreds of thousands of mainly male South Asians was due to the need for indentured servants. This is largely tied to the abolition of black slavery in the Caribbean colonies in 1834. Without the promise of free labor and a hostile working class on their hands, the Dutch colonial authorities had to find a solution – cheap Asian labor.

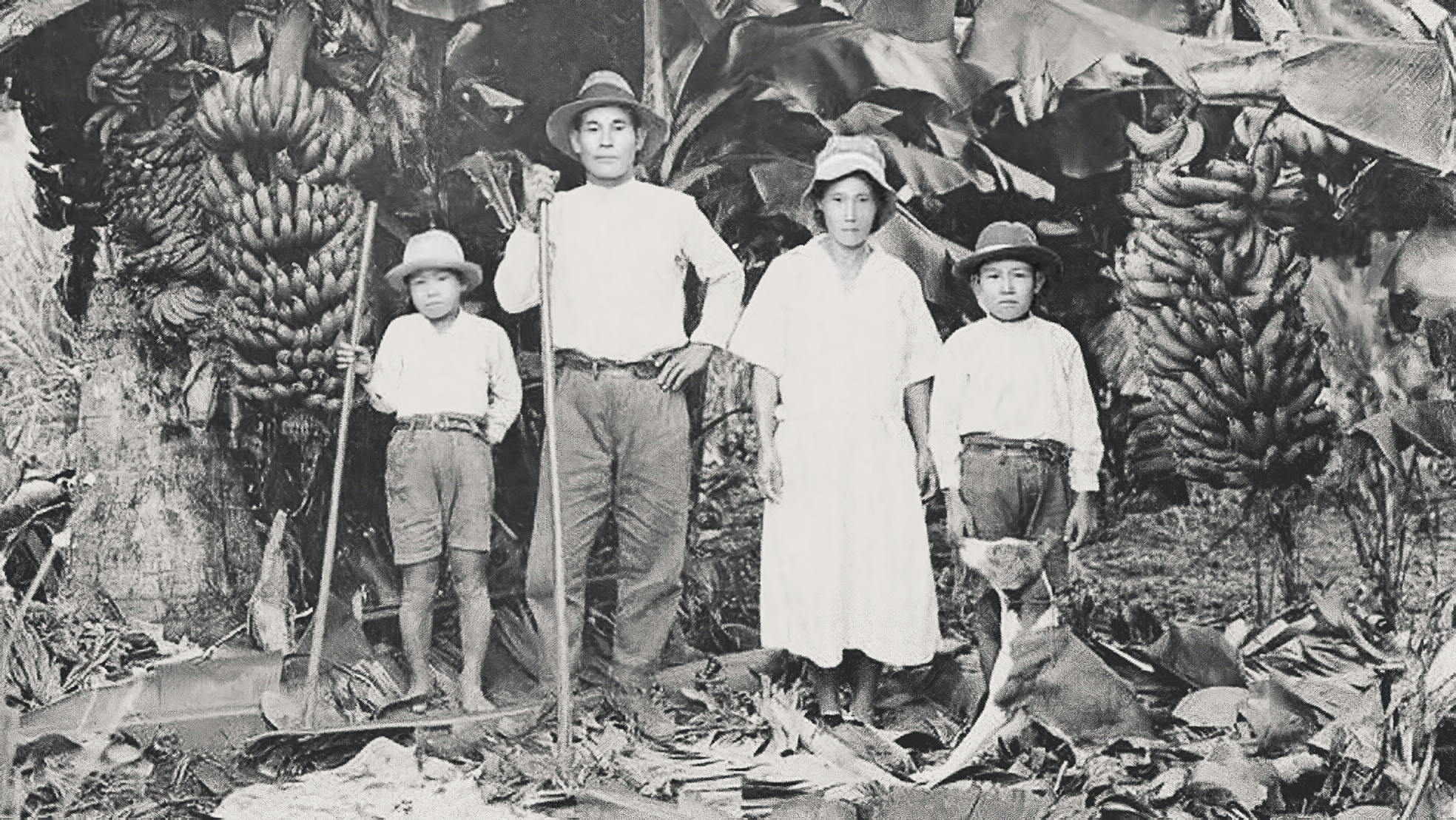
Japanese immigrant family in Brazil

Many of these immigrant populations became such fixtures in their adopted countries that they acquired names of their own. For example, the Chinese men who labored in agricultural work became known as "coolies". While these imported Asian laborers were initially just replacement for agricultural slave labor, they gradually began to enter other sectors as the economy evolved. Before long, they had entered more urban work and the service sector. In certain areas, these populations assimilated into the minority populations, adding yet another definition to go on a casta.

In some areas, these new populations caused conflict. In Northern Mexico, tensions became inevitable when the United States began to shut off Chinese immigration in the early 1880s. Many who were originally bound for the United States were re-routed to Mexico. The rapid increase in population and rise to middle/upper class standing generated strong resentment among existing residents. These tensions lead to riots. In the state of Sonora, the entire Chinese population was expelled in 1929.

Today, the overwhelming majority of Asian Latin Americans are either of East Asian (namely Chinese, Japanese or Korean), or West Asian descent (mostly Lebanese or Syrians), many of whom arrived during the second half of the 1800s and the first half of the 1900s. Japanese migration mostly came to a halt after World War II (with the exception of Japanese settlement in the Dominican Republic), while Korean migration mostly came to an end by the 1980s. Chinese migration remains ongoing in a number of countries.

Settlement of war refugees has been extremely minor: a few dozen ex-North Korean soldiers settled in Argentina after the Korean War and some Hmong settled in French Guiana after the Vietnam War.

== Roles in labor ==
Asian Latin Americans served various roles during their time as low wage workers in Latin America. In the second half of the nineteenth century, nearly a quarter of a million Chinese migrants in Cuba worked primarily on sugar plantations. The Chinese "coolies" who migrated to Peru took up work on the Andean Railroad or the Guano Fields. Over time the Chinese progressed to acquiring work in urban centers as tradesmen, restaurateurs and in the service industry. By the 1810s, approximately 25,000 Chinese migrants in Mexico found relative success with small businesses, government bureaucracy, and intellectual circles. In the 1830s, the British and Dutch colonial governments also imported South Asians to work as indentured servants to places such as Trinidad and Tobago, Suriname, Curaçao and British Guiana (later renamed Guayana). At the turn of the nineteenth and twentieth centuries, Japanese immigrants reached Brazil and Peru. Much like the Chinese, the Japanese often worked as indentured servants and low wage workers for planters. Japanese work contracts were notably more short term than those of the Chinese and the process was closely monitored by the Japanese government to dissuade abuse and foul play. In both cases, the influx of Asian migrant workers was to fill the void left in the Latin American work forces after the abolition of slavery. Employers of all kinds were desperate for a low cost replacement for their slaves so those who did not participate in any illegal slave operations turned to the Asian migrants.

== Geographic distribution ==
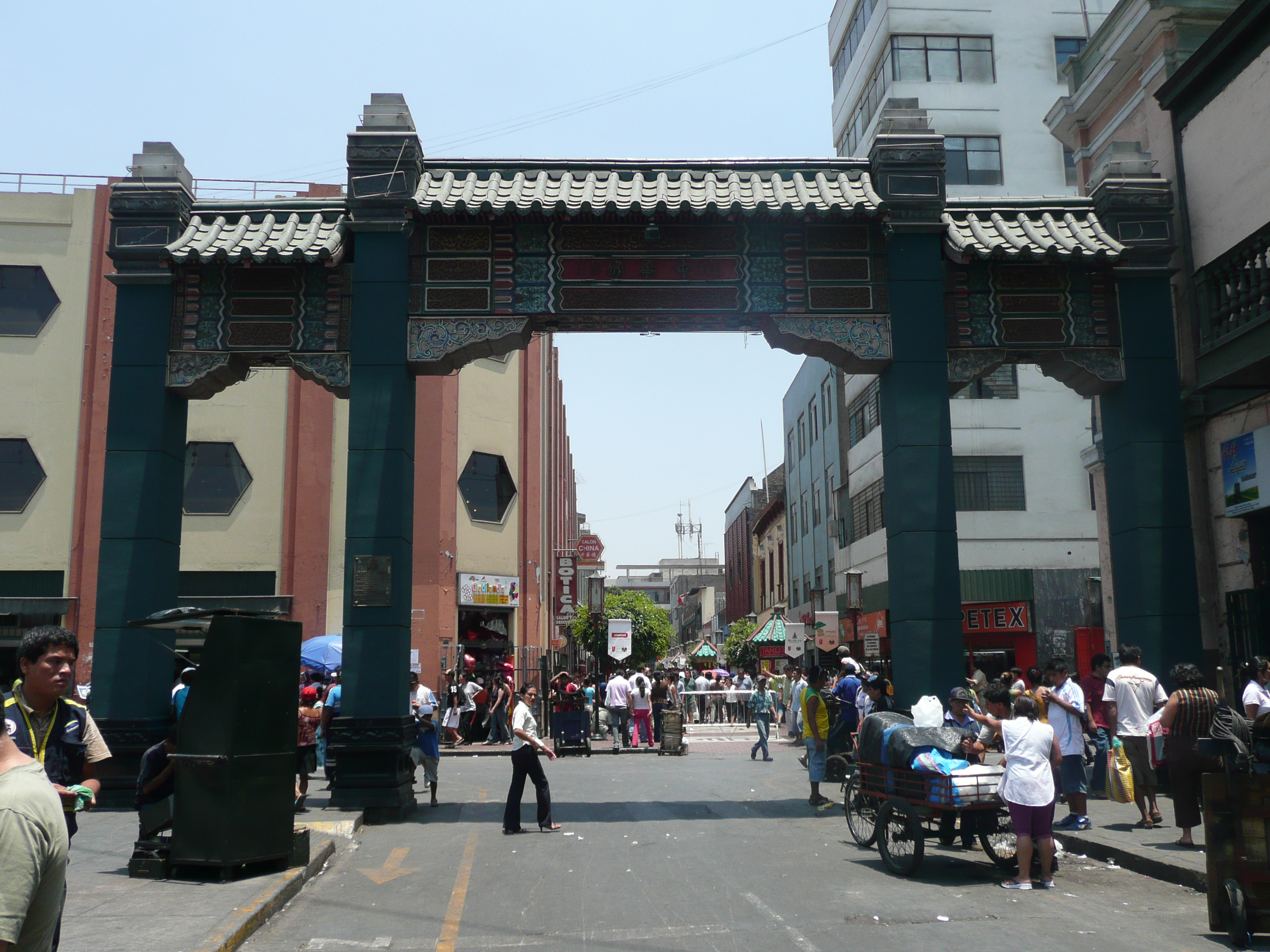
Chinatown, Lima-Peru.

Four and a half million Latin Americans (almost 1% of the total population of Latin America) are of Asian descent. The number may be millions higher, even more so if all who have partial ancestry are included. For example, Asian Peruvians are estimated at 5% of the population there, but one source places the number of all Peruvians with at least some Chinese ancestry at 5 million, which equates to 20% of the country's total population.

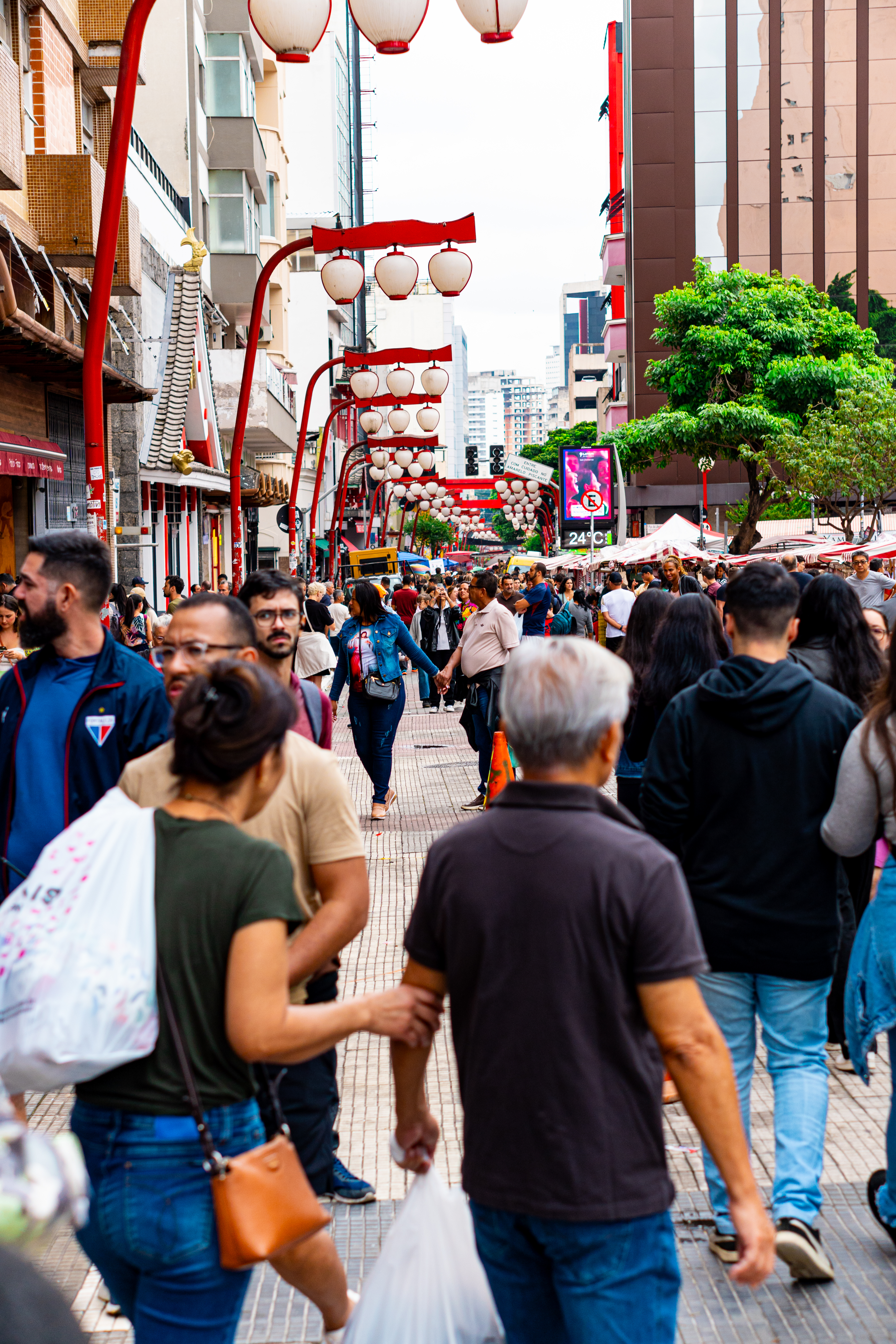
The Liberdade neighborhood is a Little Tokyo of São Paulo.

The Chinese are the most populous Asian Latin Americans. Significant populations of Chinese ancestry are found in Peru, Venezuela, Brazil, Colombia, Argentina, Cuba, Dominican Republic, Panama, Nicaragua, Puerto Rico, Mexico and Costa Rica (where they make up about 1% of the total population; or about 9,000 residents). Nicaragua is home to 14,000 ethnic Chinese; the majority reside in Managua and on the Caribbean coast. Smaller communities of Chinese, numbering just in the hundreds or thousands, are also found in Ecuador and various other Latin American countries. Many Latin American countries are home to barrios chinos (Chinatowns).

Most who are of Japanese descent reside in Brazil, Peru, Argentina, Mexico, Bolivia, Colombia and Paraguay. Japanese Peruvians have a considerable economic position in Peru. Many past and present Peruvian Cabinet members are ethnic Asians, but most particularly Japanese Peruvians have made up large portions of Peru's cabinet members and former president Alberto Fujimori was of Japanese ancestry who was the only Asian Latin American to have ever served as the head of any Latin American nation until his daughter Keiko Fujimori's election in 2026 (or the second, if taking into account Arthur Chung). Brazil is home to the largest Japanese community outside Japan, numbering about 1.7 million with ancestry alone. Brazil is also home to 10,000 Indians, 5,000 Vietnamese, 4,500 Afghans, 2,900 Indonesians, 2,608 Malaysians, and 1,000 Filipinos.

Korean people are the third largest group of Asian Latin Americans. The largest community of this group is in Brazil (specially in Southeast region) with a population of 51,550. The second largest is in Argentina, with a population of 23,603 and with active Koreatowns in Buenos Aires. More 10,000 in Guatemala, and Mexico, This last with active communities in Monterrey, Guadalajara, Coatzacoalcos, Yucatan and Mexico City. More than 1,000 in Chile, Paraguay, Venezuela, Honduras and Peru where Jung Heung-won, a Korean Peruvian, was elected mayor in City of Chanchamayo. He is the first Mayor of Korean origin in Peru and all of Latin America. There are small and important communities (less 1,000 peoples) in Colombia, Cuba, Ecuador, Bolivia, Costa Rica, Panama, Dominican Republic, Uruguay, and Puerto Rico.

== Emigrant communities ==
=== Japan ===
Japanese Brazilian immigrants to Japan numbered 250,000 in 2004, constituting Japan's second-largest immigrant population. Their experiences bear similarities to those of Japanese Peruvian immigrants, who are often relegated to low income jobs typically occupied by foreigners.

=== United States ===
In the 2000 US Census, 119,829 Hispanic or Latino Americans identified as being of Asian race alone. In 2006 the Census Bureau's American Community Survey estimated them at 154,694, while its Population Estimates, which are official, put them at 277,704.

== Composition ==
Asian Latin American population (incomplete data)
| Country | (China) Chinese | (Japan) Japanese | (South Korea) Korean | (Philippines) Filipino | Others | References |
|---|---|---|---|---|---|---|
| Argentina | No data | 115,000 | 100,063 | 20,000 | 100,000 |
| Bolivia | No data | 14,178 | 654 | 39 | No data |
| Brazil | 350,000 | 2,000,000 | 50,281 | 29,578 | No data |
| Chile | No data | 7,500 | 2,700 | 8,000 | No data |
| Colombia | No data | 4,000 | 12,000 | 17,000 |
| Costa Rica | 9,170 | No data | No data | No data | No data |
| Cuba | No data | 1200 | 900 | No data | No data | No data |
| Dominican Republic | No data | 847 | 675 | No data | No data |
| Ecuador | 150,000 | 10,000 | 714 | 1,000 | No data |
| El Salvador | 2,140 | 176 | 151 | No data | 103 |
| Guatemala | 13,700 | 288 | 12,918 | No data | No data |
| Honduras | 1,415 | 422 | No data | No data | No data |
| Mexico | 90,000 | 75,000 | 30,000 | 100,000 | 1,300 |
| Nicaragua | 14,000 | 145 | 745 | No data | No data |
| Panama | 258,886 | 456 | 421 | No data | No data | Tatyana Ali |
| Paraguay | No data | 9,484 | 5,039 | No data | No data |
| Peru | 1,300,000 | 160,000 | 1,493 | 7,500 | No data |
| Puerto Rico (Note: Note: Puerto Rico is a territory of the United States.) | >2,200 | 10,486 | 109 | 9,832 | No data |
| Uruguay | No data | 3,456 | 216 | No data | No data |
| Venezuela | No data | 2,000 | 1,000 | No data | 10,000 |

== Notable Asian Latino persons ==
Argentina

- Juliana Awada, former First Lady of Argentina, Lebanese Argentine.
- Carlos Balá, actor of Lebanese descent.
- Yamila Diaz-Rahi, model of Lebanese descent.
- Dumbfoundead, rapper Argentine-born Korean American Rapper.
- Liu Song, table tennis player; Chinese Argentine.
- Ignacio Huang, actor; Taiwanese Argentine.
- Hoshitango Imachi, ex-sumo wrestler, Japanese Argentine.
- Mario Alberto Ishii, political and mayor of the region José C. Paz, Japanese Argentine.
- Natalia Kim, actress and model, Korean Argentine.
- Chang Sung Kim, actor, Korean Argentine.
- María Kodama, writer of Japanese descent.
- Katsutoshi Kurata, martial artist, Japanese Argentine.
- Margarita Lee "Señorita Lee"; model, actress and television host; Korean Argentine.
- Yoshihiro Matsumura, martial artist, Japanese Argentine.
- Carlos Menem, lawyer and politician, former president of Argentina, Syrian Argentine.
- Eduardo Menem, politician and brother of Carlos Menem, Syrian Argentine.
- Jessica Michibata, fashion model; Japanese Argentine.
- Sergio Nakasone producer and TV director, Japanese Argentine.
- Leonardo Nam, actor; Korean Argentine.
- Jae Park, Korean American singer-songwriter born in Argentina.
- Kazuya Sakai, painter, Japanese Argentine.
- María Eugenia Suárez, actress and singer; Japanese Argentine.
- Alicia Terada, politician, Japanese Argentine.
- Marco, actor; Korean Argentine.
- Chanty, actress, model and singer; Filipina Argentine

Bolivia

- Chi Hyun Chung, politician; Korean Bolivian
- Juan Pereda, politician; Palestinian Bolivian
- Pedro Shimose, poet; Japanese Bolivian

Brazil

- Erica Awano, manga artist; Japanese Brazilian
- Suresh Biswas, adventurer; Indo-Brazilian
- Ken Chang, singer; Chinese Brazilian
- Sérgio Echigo, former footballer; Japanese Brazilian
- Boris Fausto, historian, political scientist and writer; Turkish Brazilian
- Alexandr Fier, chess grandmaster; Japanese Brazilian
- Ashok Gandotra, cricketer; Indo-Brazilian
- Kaio Felipe Gonçalves, striker; Japanese Brazilian
- Luiz Gushiken, union leader and politician; Japanese Brazilian
- Sandro Hiroshi, footballer; Japanese Brazilian
- Hugo Hoyama, tennis player; Japanese Brazilian
- Fabiane Hukuda, judoka; Japanese Brazilian
- Kaisei Ichirō, sumo wrestler; Japanese Brazilian
- Thereza Imanishi-Kari, professor; Japanese Brazilian
- Ryoki Inoue, writer; Japanese Brazilian
- Vânia Ishii, judoka; Japanese Brazilian
- Cláudio Kano, table tennis player; Japanese Brazilian
- Nathalia Kaur, model and actress; Indian descent
- Reishin Kawai, aikido practitioner and acupuncturist; Japanese Brazilian
- Pedro Ken, footballer; Japanese Brazilian
- Allam Khodair, race car driver; Japanese Lebanese Brazilian
- Felipe Kitadai, judoka; Japanese Brazilian
- Paulinho Kobayashi, footballer; Japanese Brazilian
- Luca Kumahara, table tennis player; Japanese Brazilian
- Yanna Lavigne, actress and model; Japanese Brazilian
- Iara Lee, producer, director and activist; Korean Brazilian
- Gui Lin, table tennis player; Chinese Brazilian
- Lovefoxxx, singer; Japanese Brazilian
- Manabu Mabe, painter; Japanese Brazilian
- Lyoto Machida, mixed martial artist; Japanese Brazilian
- Mitsuyo Maeda, judo master and developer of Brazilian jiu-jitsu; Japanese Brazilian
- Daniel Matsunaga, model, host, actor and footballer; Japanese Brazilian
- Jo Matumoto, former pro baseball player; Japanese Brazilian
- Froilano de Mello, microbiologist; Indo-Brazilian
- Paulo Miyashiro, triathlete; Japanese Brazilian
- Carlos Morimoto, author; Japanese Brazilian
- Mariana Ohata, triathlete; Japanese Brazilian
- Ruy Ohtake, architect; Japanese Brazilian
- Tomie Ohtake, artist; Japanese Brazilian
- Oscar Oiwa, painter, visual artist and architect; Japanese Brazilian
- Tetsuo Okamoto, swimmer; Japanese Brazilian
- Poliana Okimoto, long-distance swimmer and gold medalist; Japanese Brazilian
- Pedro Okuda, baseball shortstop; Japanese Brazilian
- Luís Onmura, judoka; Japanese Brazilian
- Hiroo Onoda, former Japanese Army officer; Japanese Brazilian
- Angela Park, golfer; Korean Brazilian
- Andy Pi, martial artist; Chinese Brazilian
- Rogério Romero, swimmer; Japanese Brazilian
- Lucas Salatta, backstroke swimmer; Japanese Brazilian
- Silvio Santos, television host and entrepreneur; Turkish Brazilian
- Michel Temer, politician, lawyer and writer who served as the 37th President of Brazil; Lebanese descent
- Daniella Sarahyba, model; Lebanese descent
- Akihiro Sato, model; Japanese Brazilian
- Sabrina Sato, model; Japanese and Lebanese descent
- Luis Shinohara, former judoka; Japanese Brazilian
- Lígia Silva, table tennis player; Japanese Brazilian
- Marcos Sugiyama, volleyball player; Japanese Brazilian
- Mahau Suguimati, track hurdler; Japanese Brazilian
- Jung Mo Sung, lay theologian; Korean Brazilian
- Manabu Suzuki, racer; Japanese Brazilian
- Rafael Suzuki, racer; Japanese Brazilian
- Rodrigo Tabata, footballer; Japanese Brazilian
- Marlon Teixeira, model; Japanese Brazilian
- Alex Yuwan Tjong, badminton player; Indonesian Brazilian
- Geovanna Tominaga, television host and actress; Japanese Brazilian
- Gustavo Tsuboi, table tennis player; Japanese Brazilian
- Felipe Wu, sport shooter; Chinese Brazilian
- Jenifer Widjaja, tennis player; Indonesian Brazilian
- Stênio Yamamoto, sports shooter; Japanese Brazilian
- Mario Yamasaki, MMA fighter; Japanese Brazilian
- Carlos Yoshimura, baseball pitcher; Japanese Brazilian
- Marcus Tulio Tanaka, football player; Japanese Brazilian

Chile

- Edgardo Abdala, footballer, Palestinian Chilean
- Carlos Abumohor, businessman and investor, Palestinian Chilean
- Roberto Bishara Adawi, footballer, Palestinian Chilean
- Diamela Eltit, writer, Palestinian Chilean
- Fernando Chomalí Garib, Roman Catholic Archbishop of Santiago, Palestinian Chilean
- Daud Gazale, footballer, Palestinian Chilean
- Daniel Jadue, politician, Palestinian Chilean
- Jordi Castell, TV personality, Palestinian Chilean
- Sergio Jadue, football executive, Palestinian Chilean
- Alfonso Leng, composer; Chinese Chilean
- Miguel Littin, movie director and screenwriter, Palestinian Chilean
- Luis Musrri, footballer, Palestinian Chilean
- Miguel Nasur Allel, businessman and football club owner, Palestinian Chilean
- Carlos Ominami, economist and politician; Japanese Chilean
- Quintín Quintana, businessmen; Chinese Chilean
- José Said, businessman, Palestinian Chilean
- Álvaro Saieh, businessman, Palestinian Chilean
- Arturo Salah, former football player, Palestinian Chilean
- Fernando Solabarrieta Chelech, journalist, TV presenter, Palestinian Chilean
- Rafael Tarud, politician, Palestinian Chilean
- José Zalaquett Daher, lawyer, Palestinian Chilean
- Marko Zaror, martial artist, actor, Palestinian Chilean

Colombia

- Shakira, of partial Lebanese descent
- Farina, Colombian rapper and reggaeton singer of Peruvian and Lebanese descent.
- José Kaor Dokú, ex-soccer player and ex-military; Japanese Colombian.
- Maru Yamayusa, Colombian actress, partial Japanese descent.
- Yu Takeuchi, mathematician; Japanese Colombian.
- Yuriko Londoño, actress and model; Japanese Colombian.
- Laura González, Miss Colombia 2017; Lebanese descent.
- Jordy Monroy, footballer, born in Colombia; Armenian origin
- Nydia Quintero Turbay, former First Lady of Colombia; Lebanese descent.
- Julio César Turbay Ayala, former lawyer and politician, Also former President of Colombia; Lebanese descent.
- Manuel Teodoro, American journalist of Colombian and Filipino descent.
- Lisa, Japanese singer-songwriter; Colombian mother

Costa Rica

- Franklin Chang-Diaz, former NASA astronaut; Chinese Spanish Costa Rican
- Cheng Siu Chung, retired football player, coach; Chinese Costa Rican
- Eduardo Li, president of the Costa Rican football federation; Chinese Costa Rican
- Harry Shum Jr., actor; Chinese Costa Rican

Cuba

- Fulgencio Batista, former President of Cuba; of partial Chinese heritage
- Yamil Chade, boxing manager; Lebanese Cuban
- Yat-Sen Chang, ballet dancer; Chinese Cuban
- Emilio Estefan, musician; Lebanese Cuban
- Wifredo Lam, artist; Afro-Chinese-Cuban
- Alfredo Abon Lee, army officer; Chinese Cuban
- Jeronimo Lim Kim, Korean Cuban known for being a part of the Cuban Revolution

Dominican Republic

- Elías Wessin y Wessin, politician; Lebanese Dominican
- Wu Xue, table tennis player; Chinese Dominican
- Akari Endo, Japanese-Dominican actress
- Lian "Jenifer" Qian, Chinese Dominican table tennis player
- Jhené Aiko, American singer; Japanese Dominican mother
- Mila J, American singer and rapper; Japanese Dominican mother

Ecuador

- Li Jian - midfielder; Chinese Ecuadorian
- Jinsop, singer; Korean Ecuadorian
- Alberto Dahik, politician; Lebanese Ecuadorian
- Carlos Moncayo, co-founder and CEO of Asiam; Chinese Ecuadorian
- Jaime Nebot, lawyer and former mayor Guayaquil; Lebanese Ecuadorian
- Julio Teodoro Salem, politician; Lebanese Ecuadorian

El Salvador

- Nayib Bukele, president of El Salvador since 2019; Palestinian descent
- Xavier Zablah Bukele, cousin of Nayib and politician; Palestinian descent
- Takeshi Fujiwara, sprinter and athlete; Japanese Salvadoran

Guatemala

- Myrna Mack, anthropologist; Chinese and Maya descent
- Helen Mack Chang, businesswoman and human rights activist; Chinese Guatemalan

Honduras

- Rodrigo Wong Arevalo, journalist and TV host; Chinese Honduran
- Hajime waki, Musician; Japanese Honduran

Mexico

- Alberto Arai, architect, theorist and writer; Japanese Mexican
- Eduardo Auyón, artist and cultural promoter; Chinese Mexican
- Jesús Chong, boxer; Chinese Mexican
- Miguel Ángel Osorio Chong, secretary of the interior of Mexico; Chinese Mexican
- Axel Didriksson, writer and professor; Japanese Mexican
- Jocelyn Enriquez, singer and songwriter, Filipino Mexican
- Ana Gabriel, Mexican singer and composer; Chinese on her mother's side
- Zhenli Ye Gon, businessman and alleged drug trafficker; Chinese Mexican
- Jesús Kumate Rodríguez, Physician and former Secretary of Health; Japanese Mexican
- Xóchitl Hamada, pro wrestler; Japanese Mexican
- Hiromi Hayakawa, singer; Japanese Mexican
- Salma Hayek, actress and producer; Lebanese descent
- Gilberto Hirata, state deputy; Japanese Mexican
- Tomoki Kameda, undefeated Boxer; Japanese Mexican
- Su Muy Key, actress and dancer; Chinese Mexican
- Pandurang Sadashiv Khankhoje, revolutionary, scholar, agricultural scientist and historian; Indo-Mexican
- Pablo Larios, goalkeeper; Japanese Mexican
- Juan Manuel Ley, founder and chairman of Casa Ley; Chinese Mexican
- Alejandro Moreno Cardenas, former governor of Campeche and national president of the Institutional Revolutionary Party; Filipino Mexican
- Alejandro Gómez Maganda, politician and former governor of the state of Guerrero; Filipino Mexican
- Eizi Matuda, botanist; Japanese Mexican
- Lyn May, actress, exotic dancer and acrobat; Chinese Mexican
- Patricia Castañeda Miyamoto, swimmer; Japanese Mexican
- Daiwon Moon, martial artist; Korean Mexican
- Kenya Mori, actress; Japanese Mexican
- Noé Murayama, actor; Japanese Mexican
- Úrsula Murayama, actress; Japanese Mexican
- Fumiko Nakashima, artist; Japanese Mexican
- Carlos Nakatani, artist; Japanese Mexican
- Isidoro Montes de Oca, revolutionary general; Filipino Mexican
- Ramón Fabié, revolutionary soldier; Filipino Mexican
- Luis Pinzón, revolutionary soldier; Filipino Mexican
- Kiyoto Ota, sculptor; Japanese Mexican
- Sanjaya Rajaram, agronomist; Indo-Mexican
- M.N. Roy, nationalist revolutionary, radical activist and political theorist; Indo-Mexican
- Catarina de San Juan, the China Poblana; Indo-Mexican
- Sugi Sito, pro wrestler; Chinese Mexican
- Romeo Villalva Tabuena, painter and printmaker; Filipino Mexican
- Nancy Taira, actress; Japanese Mexican
- Huang Yiguang, politician and aviator; Chinese Mexican

Nicaragua

- Arlen Siu, martyr of the 1979 Sandinista revolution; Chinese Nicaraguan
- Zach King, American internet personality, filmmaker, and illusionist; Chinese Nicaraguan

Paraguay

- Mario Abdo Benítez, President of Paraguay; Lebanese descent.
- Mitsuhide Tsuchida, footballer, Japanese Paraguayan.

Panama

- Jorge Cham, web comic creator of Piled Higher and Deeper, Chinese Panamanian.
- Bruce Chen, pitcher for the Cleveland Indians, Chinese Panamanian.
- Roberto Chen, Panamanian footballer of Chinese descent
- Federico Fong, musician, Panamanian-born father of Chinese descent
- Marelissa Him, model, part Chinese on her father's side
- Shey Ling Him Gordon, Panama's delegate to the Miss World 2007 competition, Chinese Panamanian.
- Sigrid Nunez, American writer (Chinese-Panamanian father, German mother)
- Mehr Eliezer - Winner of Señorita Panamá 2019, Indian Panamanian.

Peru

- Ernesto Arakaki, footballer; Japanese Peruvian
- Kenji Cabrera, footballer; Japanese Peruvian
- José Antonio Chang, former Prime Minister of Peru; Chinese Peruvian
- Alberto Fujimori, President of Peru from 1990 to 2000; Japanese Peruvian
- Keiko Fujimori, Congresswoman; Japanese Peruvian
- Kenji Fujimori, Congressman; Japanese-Peruvian
- Gu-Rum Choi, footballer; Korean Peruvian
- Susana Higuchi, politician and engineer; Japanese Peruvian
- Jorge Hirano, international football player; Japanese Peruvian
- Fernando Iwasaki, writer and historian; Japanese Peruvian
- Haruki Kanashiro, goalkeeper; Japanese Peruvian
- Elena Keldibekova, volleyball player; Kazakh Peruvian
- Valentina Shevchenko, mixed martial artist; Kyrgyz Peruvian
- Humberto Lay, architect and cleric; Chinese Peruvian
- Iván Miranda, tennis player; Chinese Peruvian
- Aldo Miyashiro, artist; Japanese Peruvian
- Augusto Miyashiro, engineer and politician; Japanese Peruvian
- Kaoru Morioka, futsal player; Japanese Peruvian
- Sum Nung, Wing Chun grandmaster; Chinese Peruvian
- José Pereda, retired footballer; Japanese Peruvian
- Víctor Polay, one of the founders of the Túpac Amaru Revolutionary Movement; Chinese Peruvian
- Venancio Shinki, painter; Japanese Peruvian
- Hector Takayama, former footballer; Japanese Peruvian
- Eduardo Tokeshi, artist; Japanese Peruvian
- Tilsa Tsuchiya, artist; Japanese Peruvian
- Edwin Vásquez, Olympic shooter; Chinese Peruvian
- José Watanabe, poet; Japanese Peruvian
- Víctor Joy Way, former Prime Minister of Peru; Chinese Peruvian
- Alan Wong, chef; Chinese Peruvian
- Erasmo Wong, businessman, owner of various retail chains; Chinese Peruvian
- Patty Wong, model; Chinese Peruvian
- Rafael Yamashiro, politician; Japanese Peruvian
- David Soria Yoshinari, footballer; Japanese Peruvian
- Jaime Yoshiyama, politician; Japanese Peruvian
- Carlos Yushimito, writer; Japanese Peruvian
- Pedro Zulen, philosopher; Chinese Peruvian
- Farid Kahhat, internationalist; Palestinian Peruvian
- Karime Scander, actress; Lebanese Peruvian
- Gigi Mitre, television presenter; Palestinian Peruvian
- Omar Chehade, politician; Palestinian Peruvian
- Daniel Abugattás, politician; Palestinian Peruvian
- Vanessa Saba, actress; Syrian-Lebanese Peruvian
- Patricia Majluf, biologist; Palestinian Peruvian
- Yehude Simon, politician; Jewish Peruvian
- Natalia Majluf, historian; Palestinian Peruvian
- Salomón Lerner Ghitis, politician; Jewish Peruvian
- Tony Succar, producer; Lebanese-Japanese Peruvian

Puerto Rico

- Aravind Enrique Adyanthaya, writer, performer and theater director; Indo-Puerto Rican
- Eduardo Bhatia, politician and senator; Indo-Puerto Rican
- Lakshmi Singh, newscaster on NPR
- Ruth D. Thorne, author; Indo-Puerto Rican
- Bruno Mars, singer, songwriter, record producer, musician and dancer; Filipino and Puerto Rican

Uruguay

- Alberto Abdala, Former Vice-president of Uruguay; Lebanese Uruguayan
- Barbara Mori, Uruguayan-born Mexican actress; Japanese and Lebanese descent

Venezuela

- Alex Cabrera Suzuki, Venezuelan first baseman and right-handed batter who played in Major League Baseball and Nippon Professional Baseball; Japanese Venezuelan
- Hana Kobayashi, singer; Japanese Venezuelan
- Kamala Lopez, American actress, director, and political activist (born in New York City but raised in Venezuela); Indian Venezuelan
- Naomi Soazo, Venezuelan judoka; Japanese Venezuelan
- Henry Zakka, Venezuelan actor; Japanese Venezuelan
- Tarek William Saab, Prosecutor General of Venezuela and former ombudsman; Lebanese Venezuelan
- Tareck El Aissami, former Vice President of Venezuela; Lebanese Venezuelan
- Elías Jaua, Minister of Education, former Foreign Minister and Vice President of Venezuela; Lebanese Venezuelan
- Mariam Habach, Miss Venezuela 2015; Syrian descent
- James Tahhan, Venezuelan chef; Syrian Venezuelan

== See also ==
- Latin Americans
- Chinese Latin American cuisine
- Chinatowns in Latin America
- Japantown
- Koreatown
