= List of Asian Mexicans =

This page is a list of past and present notable Asian Mexicans.

This list does not include Lebanese Mexicans; see List of Lebanese people in Mexico.

== Arts/architecture/design ==
- Alberto T. Arai- architect, theorist and writer
- Eduardo Auyón- artist and cultural promoter
- Helen Bickham- artist
- Alejandro Honda- painter, puppeteer (es)
- Leonel Maciel- artist; member of the Salón de la Plástica Mexicana
- Carlos Nakatani- artist
- Luis Nishizawa- painter
- Kiyoto Ota- sculptor
- Midori Suzuki - artist
- Shinzaburo Takeda- painter, printmaker and professor of art
- Ayako Tsuru- artist
- Romeo Villalva Tabuena- painter and printmaker
- Shino Watabe- artist

== Business and industry ==
- Carlos Kasuga Osaka- businessman
- Juan Manuel Ley- businessman
- Rajagopal- expert in business and marketing at Tec de Monterrey
- Zhenli Ye Gon- businessman; alleged drug trafficker

== Entertainment ==
- Bruce Chun- cinematographer
- Jocelyn Enriquez- singer and songwriter
- Federico Fong- musician and producer
- Ana Gabriel- singer
- Hiromi Hayakawa- singer and actress
- Lyn May- actress, exotic dancer
- Bárbara Mori- actress and model
- Kenya Mori- actress
- Noé Murayama- actor
- Úrsula Murayama- actress
- Seki Sano - actor, stage director
- Kavka Shishido- drummer and vocalist
- Su Muy Key- actress, dancer
- Nancy Taira- actress
- Sachi Tamashiro- actress, voice actress
- Beng Zeng- actor, comedian (es)

== Fashion ==
- Issa Lish- model
- Mirra or Catarina de San Juan- the "China Poblana"

== Literature ==
- Axel Didriksson Takayanagi- writer, professor at UNAM
- Babaji Singh- credited with translating the Guru Granth Sahib into Spanish

== Military ==
- Isidoro Montes de Oca- fought in the Mexican War of Independence
- Ramón Fabié- fought in the Mexican War of Independence
- Luis Pinzón- fought in the Mexican War of Independence
- Francisco Mongoy- fought in the Mexican War of Independence
- Kingo Nonaka- Captain, combat medic, photographer

== Politics ==
- René Ricardo Fujiwara Montelongo- politician affiliated with PANAL
- Pedro Kumamoto- Independent politician
- Jesús Kumate Rodríguez - physician and former Secretary of Health
- Alejandro Gómez Maganda- former Governor of Guerrero
- Gilberto Antonio Hirata Chico- state deputy for Ensenada Municipality
- Miguel Ángel Osorio Chong- former Secretary of the Interior; former Governor of Hidalgo

== Science ==
- Alejandro Higashi- linguist, academic investigator (es)
- Eizi Matuda- botanist
- Sanjaya Rajaram- agronomist
- Keiko Shirai Matsumoto- biochemist, Universidad Autónoma Metropolitana professor (es)

== Sports ==
- Patricia Castañeda Miyamoto- swimmer
- Jesús Alberto Chong- boxer
- Ayako Hamada- wrestler
- Xóchitl Hamada- wrestler
- Pablo Larios Iwasaki- goalkeeper
- Ernesto Carlos Kuk Lee- baseball player
- Dai-won Moon- martial artist
- Sugi Sito- wrestler

== See also ==
- List of Mexicans
