= Taekwondo in Mexico =

Taekwondo was introduced to Mexico in 1969 by the Korean-Mexican martial artist Dai-won Moon. With over 1.5 million practitioners and 3,500 schools throughout the country, taekwondo is one of the most popular sports. Mexico has also been competitive internationally in this sport. More than forty Mexican taekwondo athletes have won medals at the World Taekwondo Championships.

The Federación Mexicana de Taekwondo ("Mexican Taekwondo Federation") is the highest representative body in Mexico of the World Taekwondo.

== History ==
Taekwondo arrived in Mexico in 1969 thanks to the Korean master Dai Won Moon, who founded the Moo Duk Kwan Association and established the first school, being considered the "father of Mexican taekwondo." From then on, the discipline grew rapidly, consolidating itself as a sport and a self-defense practice. Despite internal divisions and the emergence of other organizations, Mexican taekwondo has achieved notable international successes, including Olympic medals, and has become one of the most practiced martial arts in the country.

Throughout the 1970s and 1980s, the sport grew rapidly. Numerous academies were created throughout the country, and Mexico began to actively participate in international competitions. In 1976, the Federación Mexicana de Taekwondo was created.

The pinnacle of Mexican taekwondo came when the sport was included as a demonstration sport at the 1988 Summer Olympics, and later as an official sport at the 2000 Summer Olympics, where Víctor Estrada won the country's first Olympic medal, taking bronze.

At the 2008 Summer Olympics, María Espinoza surpassed Estrada's result by winning the gold medal, becoming the second Mexican woman to achieve this feat since Soraya Jiménez (2000).
