= ShapeWriter =

ShapeWriter (previously known as Shorthand-Aided Rapid Keyboarding (SHARK)) was a keyboard text input method for tablet, handheld PCs, and mobile phones invented by Shumin Zhai and Per Ola Kristensson at IBM Almaden Research Center and the Department of Computer and Information Science at Linköping University.

Using ShapeWriter text entry software, a user draws words on a graphical keyboard using a pen. Instead of tapping the keys, the user draws a pen gesture that connects all the letters in the desired word. After some usage the user learns the movement pattern for the commonly used words and can write them faster than is possible on a traditional virtual keyboard.

The first system described by Shumin Zhai and Per Ola Kristensson (2003) was only a prototype system that could recognize about 100 pen gestures for the top 100 words used in the English language. It used a handwriting recognition algorithm that relied on dynamic programming to recognize the word patterns drawn from a lexicon. The next version described by Per Ola Kristensson and Shumin Zhai (2004) has a fundamentally different recognition engine that can recognize 50,000 - 60,000 words with low latency. This system introduced the notion that every word in a large lexicon should be possible to write by tracing the letters. It is this system that was the basis for the software release on IBM alphaWorks that is generally associated with the term "ShapeWriter".

ShapeWriter was acquired by Nuance Communications, and taken off the market in 2010; its technology presumably incorporated as part of Nuance's FlexT9 app in 2011.

== iPhone ==
ShapeWriter was made available for the iPhone approximately in 2008 and was revised several times (including ShapeWriter Lite and ShapeWriter Pro or Plus) before being pulled due to its sale to Nuance Communications (see following entry).

Those who purchased the iPhone version continued to use it and it also functioned on iPads v. 1 and 2 until 2013.

As of 2013 it no longer functions on iOS devices and is no longer available in Apple's App Store.

== Android ==
ShapeWriter software was made available as a free application for Android (operating system) smartphones through the Android Market. As a touchscreen keyboard replacement, it had over 50,000 users on Android worldwide. It was available only for Android OS versions 1.6 or higher. ShapeWriter for Android was available in 7 European languages including English, Spanish, and German. There was also a Beta release for Android 1.5 phones including the HTC Hero and Droid Eris.

ShapeWriter, Inc. was purchased by Nuance Communications and the ShapeWriter software was removed from the Android Market indefinitely on June 20, 2010.
