= Ruth D. Thorne =

Puerto Rican writer

Ruth Thorne is a Puerto Rican author whose written work is emphatic on the impact that socio-cultural and psycho emotional considerations have on the feminine psyche. Her first novel, Crónicas del Barrio, was a story about love, humor and gossip in her hometown of Mayagüez. Her books have been the subject of elementary school teachings. Ruth Thorne's written works reflect the impact of diasporic migration and a strong lineup with historical facts. While it has been classified under magical realism, the style and funny power plays between the sexes set in usually humble neighborhoods align with socio-cultural behaviors rather than feminism.

== Early life and ancestry ==
Ruth Thorne was born in the Western town of Mayagüez, on the Caribbean island of Puerto Rico. She was an only child. Her father was an engineer and her mother a social worker with a degree in psychology. Ruth Thorne's diverse family background provides her rich experiences from which she creates remarkable characters. During a radio interview in 2006, she credited her multi-ethnic background for feeling at home around different cultures. When asked about the uniqueness of having a multi-ethnic background, she explained that it is not a rare attribute in areas such as Guyana, where her father was born.

== Education ==
A political science major and psychology minor, Ruth Thorne earned her bachelor's degree from the University of Puerto Rico Mayagüez Campus. She attended David G. Farragut Elementary School in Mayagüez's central area and Manuel A. Barreto Junior High School (both public schools), where she met Juan Carlos Gaston, a friendship that would prove instrumental in her creative process. She finished her Junior High at YMCA Private School and graduated from high school at Pablo Casasus Presbyterian School.

== Written work ==
Ruth Thorne won school prizes in curricular writing competitions but said she considered her writing more as an academic duty than a real passion [2]. During a walk in the Parque de los Proceres in Mayagüez, she ran into Juan C. Gaston Juan Carlos Gastón, former classmate and educational advocate. She said during an interview with radio personality Toti Figueroa[3] that Gaston inspired a character in her first novel, Carlitos Forrestier.

Prior to beginning her career as a writer, she was a wellness columnist for a regional newspaper in the southwest of Puerto Rico.

After completing Crónicas del Barrio, she finished two children's books that are part of the corpus of books used by the Department of Education: "Cuqui Naveira y las Letras en Cursivo" and "Coqui Melchor". She would write her second novel, titled "Aceite Camelot", during the next Christmas Season. Her third novel was begun exactly two days later, "Dalila", translated into "Yearn and Harrow". The author described Dalila's creative process as "exhausting".

== Novels and books ==
- Crónicas del Barrio
- Aceite Camelot
- Dalila
- Cuqui Naveira y las Letras en Cursivo
- Coqui Melchor
- Elizenda Escobar

== Characters ==
Ruth Thorne's plots revolve around conflict management, and all ae infused with realism. She has expressed her desire to create fictional women who feel real, with disturbing virtues and adorable flaws.

== Female archetypes and personality description ==
Female characters show a tendency to suffer great setbacks and hardship. Her writing style usually showcases Female Type A's and women who need to make life changing choices during severe hardship. Her literary vehicle tends to rely on the character's resiliency and their ability to fulfill ambition or overcome traumatic experiences.
