= Hajime Waki =

Honduran-Japanese singer-songwriter (born 1999)

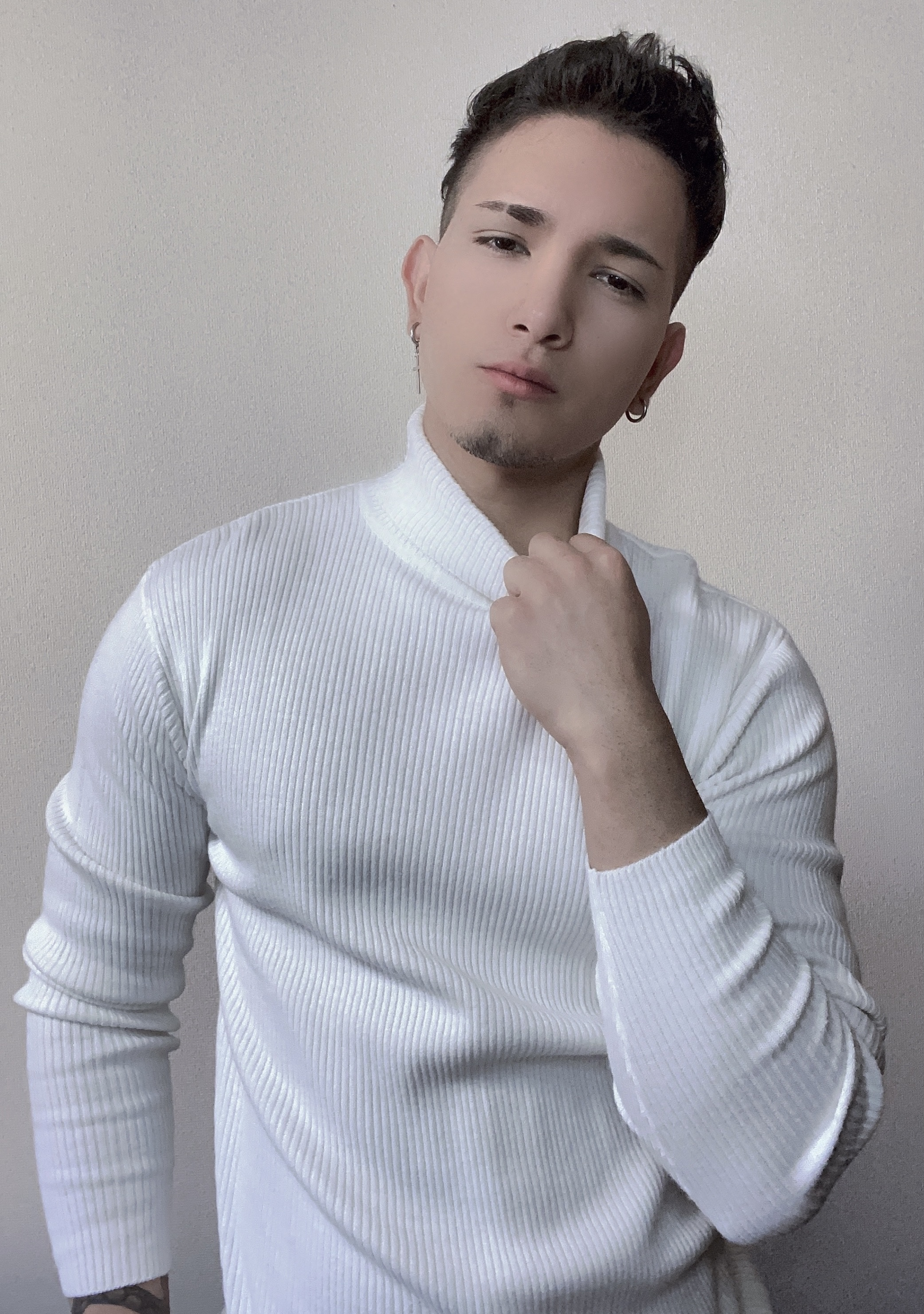
Hajime Waki

Hajime Waki (脇一, born in 1999) is a Honduran-Japanese singer-songwriter of Bachata music that gained popularity after playing and composing songs of this genre in Japanese. He is the first artist who composes mixing this three languages altogether in one song (Japanese, English, Spanish). He has a mixture of cultures there being born in Honduras and his mother being a Japanese Dominican.

== Biography ==
He was born and raised in the city of Comayagua in Honduras, his father is from Honduras and his mother is Japanese with Dominican Republic descent. Since he was a child he had a fondness for writing romantic poems as well as being very interested in the regional music. During his high school days he had a brief rock band where they came to play in the city until they separated, it is there where he begins to compose bachata music and write lyrics for his songs at home, in his own words his greatest inspiration. During his beginning as a composer in his adolescence, he was the American-Dominican singer Romeo Santos, the vocalist of the bachatra band Aventura and Takahiro Moriuchi, lead singer of Japanese rock band One Ok Rock.

=== Beginning of his career ===
When he finished school, he decided to travel to the United States, to begin his first album recordings, where he received a lot of support from Honduran and Dominican people such as Sandy Jorge and the Rosario Brothers to start his professional career recording muisca bachata sung in Japanese. He sang along with Romeo Santos in 2015 during his tour when he gave his concert in Tegucigalpa.

=== Present day ===
Currently he has recorded music videos in Tokyo and seeks to promote his career in the United States composing in Spanish and Japanese, one of his characteristics as an artist is the Manga style art on his Album covers as in the one titled "Ultimo Adiós" (最後 の別 れ, Saigo no wakare). He is now working his music career in Japan. But not only he is in the music business, being CEO of his own company "Elysian".
