= Haruki Kanashiro =

Peruvian footballer (born 1977)

Personal information
- Full name: Haruki Junior Kanashiro Culquimboz
- Date of birth: 11 September 1977 (age 49)
- Place of birth: Lima, Peru
- Height: 1.79 m (5 ft 10 in)
- Position: Goalkeeper

Senior career*
| Years | Team | Apps | (Gls) |
| 2000–2003 | Deportivo AELU | | |
| 2004 | Sport Ancash | | |
| 2005–2008 | La Peña Sporting | | |
| 2009 | Sport Boys | | |
| 2009–2011 | León de Huánuco | 3 | (0) |
| 2013 | Alianza Universidad | | |
| 2014 | Alianza Cristiana | | |
- * Club domestic league appearances and goals

Haruki Kanashiro Culquimboz (born 11 September 1977 in Lima) is a Peruvian former professional footballer who played as a goalkeeper. He played for León de Huánuco in the first division when they finished as the national runner-up in the championship.

He is of Japanese descent. After retiring as a player, he became a youth football coach.

== Club career ==
Kanashiro started out his career in 2000 with Deportivo AELU, playing for them until 2003.

Then he would have a spell with Sport Ancash in 2004. The following year he joined La Peña Sporting and featured for them until 2008.

Then in January 2009 Kanashiro joined León de Huánuco. He played eight matches in the National Stage in Huánuco's championship win of the 2009 Copa Perú.

The following season, he made his league debut in the Torneo Descentralizado under manager Franco Navarro.
