= Midori Suzuki (artist) =

Japanese artist

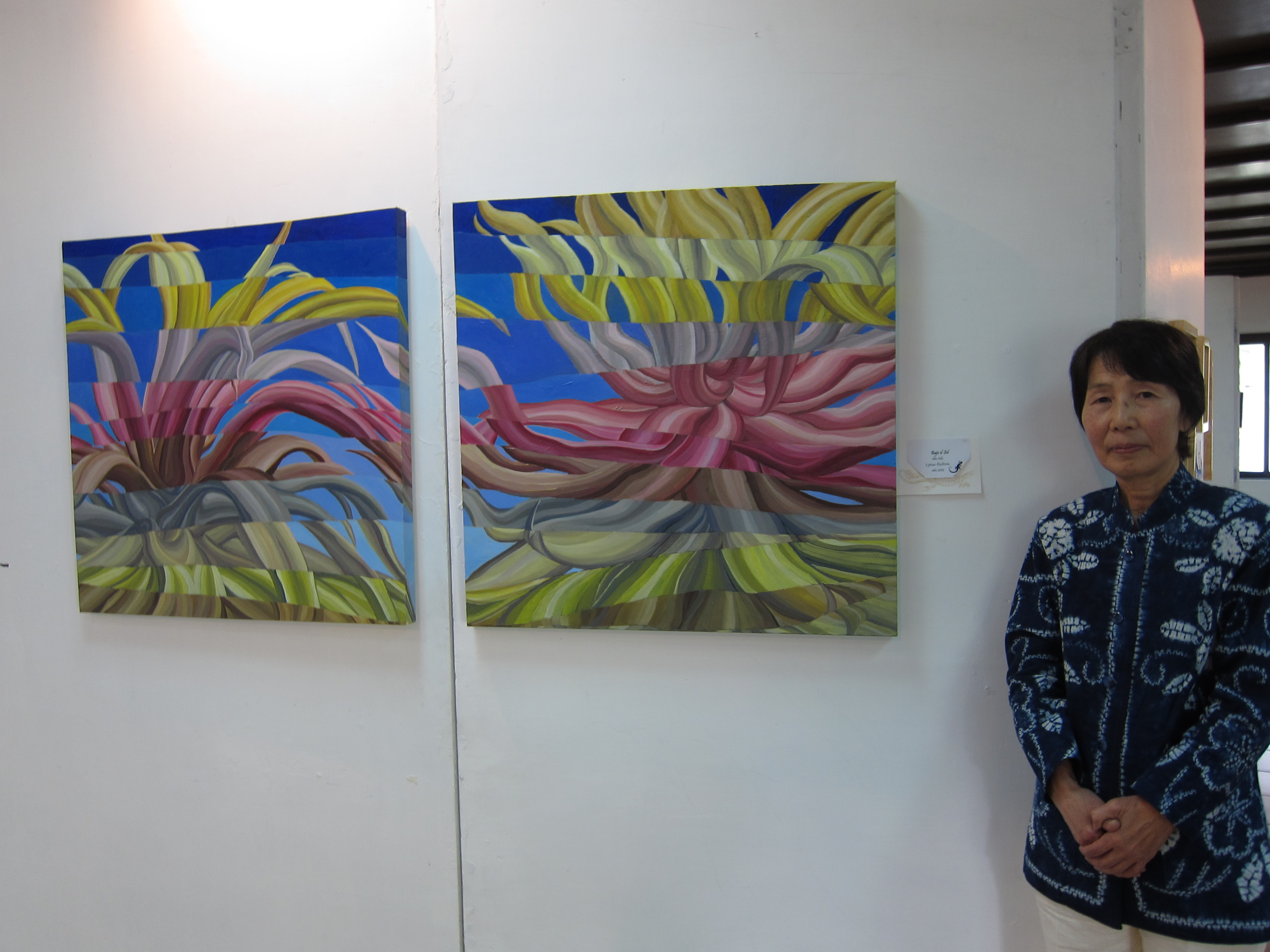
Artist presenting at the Mexico Japan Association in Mexico City

Midori Suzuki is a Japanese artist who has developed her career mostly in Mexico, both as an individual artist and as a member of the Japanese-Mexican artist collective Flor de Maguey. She was trained as an artist in Japan and Spain. In the latter country, she saw a sarape for the first time and became interested in Latin America, going to Mexico for the first time in the early 1980s. She met her husband while in the country and although they first lived in Japan, they then decided to live permanently in Mexico. Suzuki has had numerous exhibitions in Japan, Spain and Mexico, both individually and in group showings. Her work has also been featured in books and magazines.

== Life ==
Midori Suzuki was born on August 21, 1947, in Kesennuma, Japan. She attended the Musahino Art University in Japan, graduating with a degree in Fine Arts. In 1974, she went to study tapestry art at the Escuela Artística in Granada, Spain for four years. Here she met a young woman from Veracruz wearing traditional sarape. Not knowing what it was, its form and colors made Suzuki interested in Latin America and its art. In 1979, her tapestry work won first prize at the Concurso de Andalucía.

In the early 1980s, she received university support to travel to Mexico. During this trip she met her future husband, Javier Farías Díaz (father of her child Maya). The courtship was long-distance by mail for about a year. They married and decided that he would live at first in Japan; however her hometown of Kesennuma was very traditional and did not support the mixed marriage. For this reason the couple then moved to Mexico to live permanently in 1986.

Suzuki’s hometown was one of the severely affected by the 2011 Japan earthquake and tsunami. Unable to reach her family for ten days, she still had to attend an art exhibition. After ten days, she saw a news report on the Internet and saw a woman knocking on the doors of the houses of her family’s neighborhood. When the reporter knocked at the door of her family’s house, her sister came out and said that everyone had survived. After this, she was able to get through by telephone and confirm what she saw on the screen. While her immediate family survived, Suzuki lost five aunts and uncles and all survivors lost all of their possessions.

During those ten days she decided to do something to help. She circulated two large poster boards with images of traditional Japanese and Mexican dolls for people to write messages of support. The response was so overwhelming that she made ten more. She then translated all the messages into Japanese, some of which were complete paragraphs. When Suzuki could finally travel to Japan, she brought the poster boards with her to show at schools, community meetings and other places in the affected areas. She also organized a demonstration of Mexican piñatas at a primary school to provide some fun relief. The poster boards remain at the San Juan Bautista Museum in Ishinomaki. In addition, she and the Mexico Japan Associated collected 120,000 pesos for three communities in Miyagi.

== Art career ==
In Mexico, she first worked by giving individual art classes and began to paint watercolors which show Mexican pre Hispanic influence. She has continued since then to teach young people in various schools, especially the Liceo Mexicano Japonés.

Her first exhibitions were in Japan and Granada, Spain, starting in 1971. These shows were held in venues such as the Muromachi Gallery, the Kesennuma Cultural Center and the Hamada Annex in Japan as well as the Centro Artístico in Granada twice.(cv) In 1993, her first show in Mexico was at the Mexico-Japan Association in Mexico City, where she has exhibited over eighteen times to date. From that time to the present, she has had individual exhibitions at the Instituto Michoacano de Cultura in Morelia, the Kahohu-Kesennuma Exhibition Hall, the Casa de Cultura in Tlalpan, the municipal palace of Naucalpan, the Centro Asturiano and the San Juan Bautista Museum in Japan. In 2012, she exhibited 24 works as “El silencio de movimiento at UNAM’s Centro Cultural Acatlán. She has also had numerous group showings, recently concentrating on exhibitions with the Flor de Maguey group. This is Mexican-Japanese artist group which also includes along Shino Watabe, Shoko Sumi and Beatriz Lazo. The group exhibits together, creating works related to the themes related to the culture of both countries.

She has illustrated books such as “Abrazando la luz de la mañana” and “Cuentos de Kesennuma.” She Photographs of her art have appeared in various magazines such as Magno Plus and Gaceta.

== Artistry ==
Her artistic training was in figurative representation and Spanish rug design, have influenced her work to the present day, seen in exhibitions such as the 2012 El silencio de movimento exhibit. Her art is figurative, with lines and colors used to evoke tranquility. It includes large works with waves and other techniques to give the impression of movement. In the work Las Evas, Suzuki uses a series of circles to create a female silhouette. Another recurrent theme is the appearance of horses as well as the colors green and purple. She says colors used in Mexican rugs caught her attention and she used to paint in red, yellow and blue but changed to green and purple as they are more soothing.

Suzuki states that when she arrived to Mexico, she was impressed by its pre Hispanic culture, especially its ceramics and featherwork. She says the working in Mexico allows her more creative freedom to experiment with colors and techniques. Works which reflect her view of Mexican culture include A través del tiempo, Tejer el aroma del tiempo and El hilo que sostiene el tiempo. One of her inspirations is the sense of movement that deformed layers of earth have, or as she calls them “little waves of the different epochs of the Earth” especially as they appear in old lava flows that she can see at her house in Mexico. The lines she creates often represent the link between life and death as well as water, wind and the movement of figures such as women and horses. However, the aim is not to depict frailty but rather serenity. Suzuki says that she has been fascinated by Mexican imagery and works to capture it in her art but does not understand how people deduce that she is Japanese immediately from her art.
