= Jeronimo Lim Kim =

Korean Cuban (1926–2006)

Jeronimo Lim Kim (1926–2006) was a Cuban who was known for being a part of the Cuban Revolution. He was a law school student and a classmate of Fidel Castro.

== Early life ==
Jeronimo's father, Lim Cheon-taek (1903–1985), left Korea in hope of a better life to go to Mexico. From Mexico, Cheon-taek went to Cuba in 1921. Jeronimo was the oldest of six children. He was the first Korean to attend university in Cuba. He went to law school at Havana University.

== Cuban Revolution ==
Jeronimo worked with Che Guevara in pushing forth the Cuban Revolution. He helped foster relations between North Korea, and as a result North Korea and Cuba became strong allies.

== Legacy and later life ==
Jeronimo became the Chief Agent at the National Revolutionary Police Force. He was said to be a non-ideologue who only wanted his people to do better. Some have labeled Jeronimo as Cuba's Ahn Chang-ho.

Jeronimo is the subject of a documentary titled Jeronimo: The Untold Tale of Koreans in Cuba.

== See also ==
- Koreans in Cuba
- Koreans in Mexico
