= Shino Watabe =

Japanese artist (born 1970)

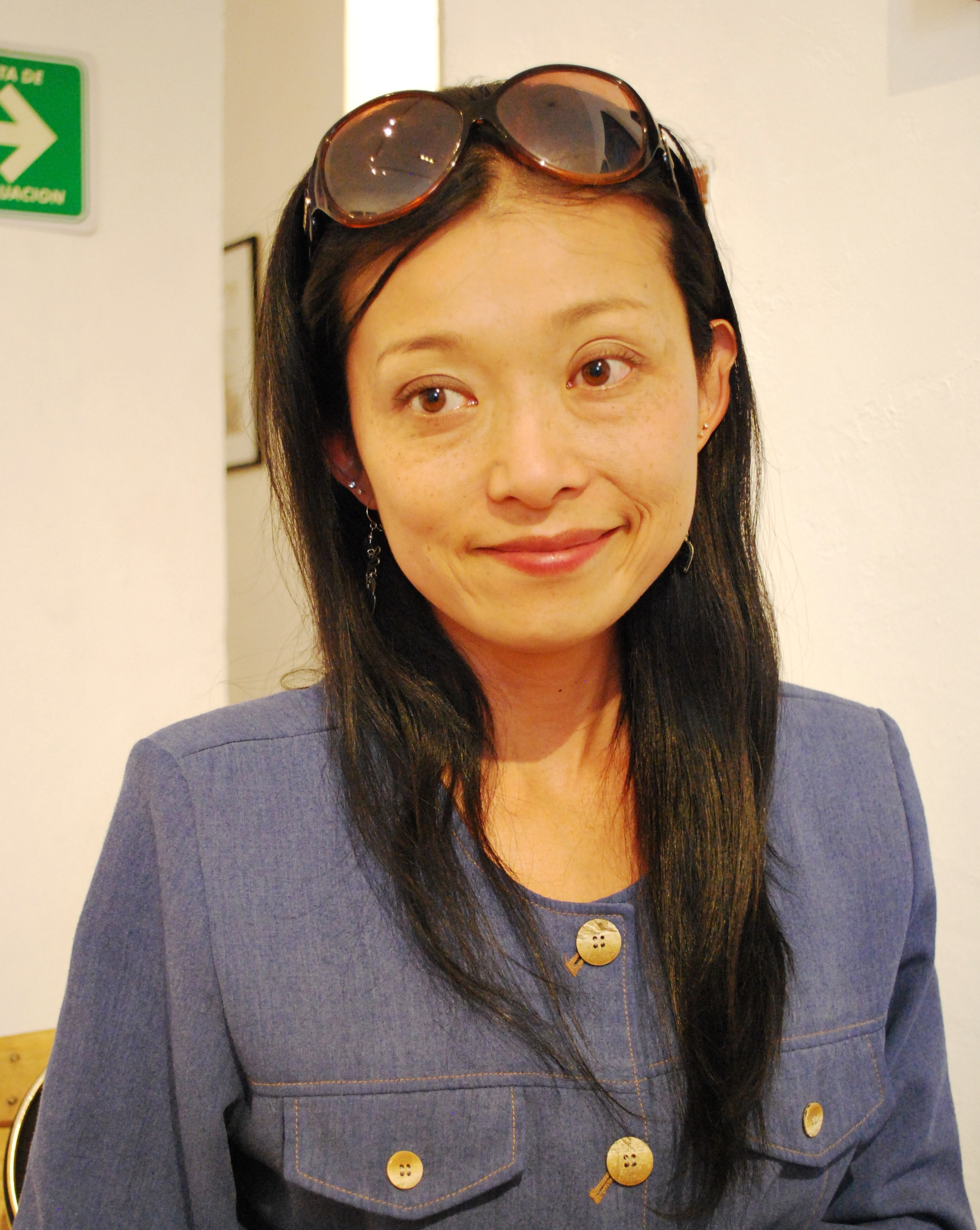
- Shino Watabe at Garros Galería, June 2012
- Born: 1970 (age 55–56); Tokyo, Japan

Shino Watabe (渡部思乃, Watabe Shino) is a Japanese artist who has lived and worked in Mexico permanently since 1990. She has had numerous individual and collective exhibitions in Mexico, more recently working with a group of Mexican and Japanese female artists called Flor de Maguey. In 2008, she partially lost her sight due to illness, but she remains a working artist, continuing to create and exhibit her work.

== Life ==
Shino Watabe was born in 1970 in Tokyo, Japan. According to Watabe, she was a lonely girl who grew up with a “hell” in her heart. Instead of seeing things outwardly, she preferred to see them inwardly.

She studied from 1985 to 1988 at the preparatory school affiliated with the Women’s University of Fine Arts. From 1987 to 1988 she studied painting and drawing at the Evening School of Fine Arts of the Yoyogi Seminary. From 1988 to 1990, she studied at the Women’s University of Fine Arts majoring in painting. In 1990, she came to Mexico City to study at the Escuela Nacional de Artes Plásticas of UNAM. She has studied under Jesús Martínez, Pedro Ascencio and Gilberto Aceves Navarro.

She has lived in Mexico City since coming to study, speaking Spanish fluently since shortly after her arrival. She is one of many Japanese artists who have come to Mexico because of the culture the opportunities it affords them. Watabe has no interest in returning permanently to Japan.

In 2008, she partially lost her sight due to illness but still works as an artist, exhibiting individually and collectively.

== Career ==
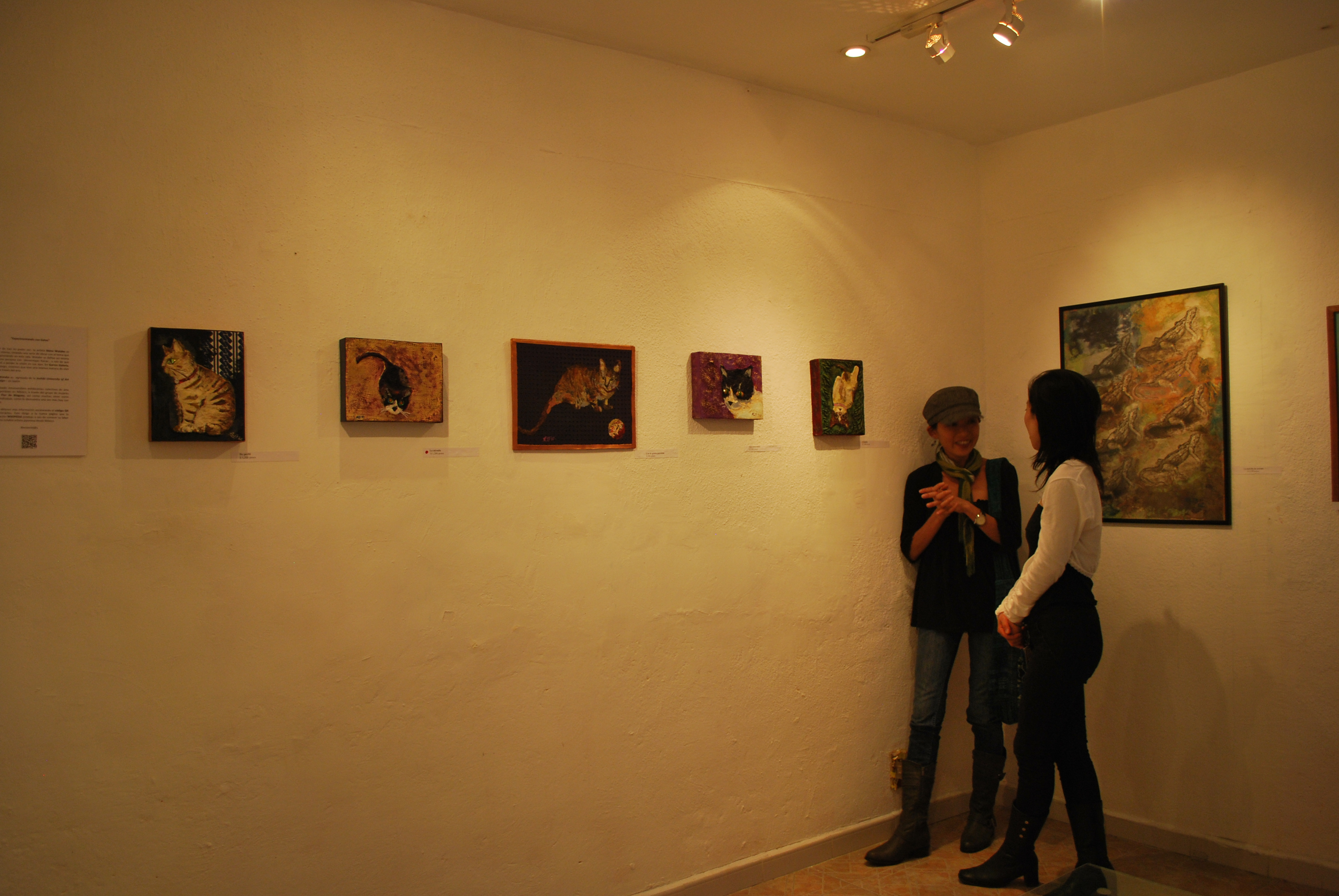
Shino Watabe and Shoko Sumi at the opening of "Experimentando con gatos" exhibition at the Garros Galería.

In her early career, she participated in ten collective exhibitions in both Japan and Mexico. Individual exhibitions include Desde mi infancia at the Centro Cultural San Ángel Mexico City (1994), Esencias visible é invisibles at the Galería Coyoacán Mexico City (1995), Corrompidos at the Cafetería el Cafeciofono in Mexico City (1996), Rincón Nostálgico at the Parque Arturo Mundet in Mexico City (1998), Luchando por proteger la sensibilidad at the Casa de la Cultura México-Japón Mexico City (1999), La Búsqueda de mi ser at the Cafetería El Infinito in Monterrey (2001), Venta de obras de Shino Watabe at the Casa Antigua in McAllen, Texas (2005) and Corazón de Piedra at the Museo Histórico de Reynosa in Reynosa, Tamaulipas (2006). In 2011, she had an exhibition of pieces such as violins and images of cats made with recyclable materials at the Tarragona, Bocados del Mundo restaurant in Mexico City. The materials included cardboard, egg cartons and cigarette butts. In 2012, she exhibited Experimentando con gatos at the Garros Galería.

Her work was featured in 1997 in the Trabajo Social magazine published by UNAM.

Watabe belongs to a group of Japanese and Mexican female artists in Mexico City called the Flor de Maguey (maguey flower) which also has sculptors Beatrix Lazo, Keiko Toda, painters Shoko Sumi and Midori Suzuki and engravers Patricia Medillín and Sumi Hamano. This group regularly has exhibitions together. Flor de Maguey’s works reflect, through painting and sculpture, on the traditions, life and nature of the two countries represented in the group. In 2011, she had an exhibition with fellow member Patricia Medillín called “Perspectivas Femininas” at the Foro Cultural Casa Hilvana in honor of International Women’s Day. Another exhibition with the entire group was “Cuatro mujeres, cuatro perspectivas del grupo de artistas Flor de Maguey” at the Espacio Japón in Mexico City in 2012. At this exhibition, Watabe’s contribution was fifteen works related to the 2011 Japanese earthquake.

== Artistry ==
Her work is mostly autobiographical, strongly influenced by figurative art. Her work still contains some Japanese aesthetic despite living in Mexico for over twenty years. Her creativity is introverted. She relates a story that when she was a child, she would take stones from the bottom of a river, which shined as they were wet. However, when she got them home, they would be dry and less attractive. She has found the same effect with words, profound as she thinks them but less important once said. It is also the reason she paint self-portraits, keeping an element of the internal. One of these was painted just after the 2011 Japan earthquake to capture her feelings about the disaster. Watabe’s works often speak of pain and melancholy, but also with an element of strength. She states her aim is that with enthusiasm and love we can continue against difficulties. However, her work has also included flowers and women who are magical and related to flowers in some way, using rich colors.
