= Jinsop =

Ecuadorian singer (1959–2012)

Background information
- Born: Jinsop Ho O’dirling; 1959; Seoul, South Korea
- Died: June 24, 2012 (aged 52–53) Santa Elena, Ecuador
- Genres: Ballads, Pop, Rock
- Occupation: Singer
- Years active: 1973 - 2012

Jinsop Ho O’dirling, known as "Jinsop" (Seoul, South Korea, 1959 – Santa Elena, Ecuador, June 24, 2012) was an Ecuadorian singer of Korean and American heritage who sang Spanish ballads, pop, and rock music. He reached fame in the 1970s and 1980s in Latin America. The name "Jinsop" means "Fire Star" in Korean.

== Personal life ==
Jinsop was born in Seoul, South Korea. His father was an American diplomat named Fred Odirling, and his mother was a Korean woman named Myonghui. When he was a child in South Korea he was discriminated against for having a non-Korean father. He then moved to the United States because his father got work as an electrical engineer at NASA. When he was 15 years old he moved to Quito, Ecuador where his father began work as a diplomat at the research station. His parents returned to the United States, but he remained in Ecuador because he liked the country. At sixteen he studied at the Academia Cotopaxi and Anderson College where he met his wife Silvia Jarrin, who taught him Spanish with beginning language books, and with whom he had three children; Jinsop Junior, a business manager in South Carolina, Alexander, who studied systems engineering in Quito, and David, who earned a doctorate in economics.

== Beginning of singing career ==
Jinsop, who spoke English and Korean, learned to sing in Spanish before learning how to speak it, since he had no knowledge of the language before arriving to Ecuador. Soon after, in 1972, Jinsop and his mother organized a music festival where they sang for a rock band called "Las Hormigas" (The Ants). At the conclusion of the festival, they won first prize, but people were angry because another band called The Apostles (who received greater applause) did not win, and so the crowd lit the dais on fire in protest. The prize was then taken from Jinsop and awarded to The Apostles. Jinsop fled the festival, but was arrested a few days later. Soon after he became a member of The Apostles, and one of the judges of the aforementioned festival, Héctor Napolitano, who was a famed singer at the time, invited him to the recording studio of the label Ifesa to interpret the songs of Paul Anka and other artists, and that is how he released his first album called Puppy Love, which reached major airplay throughout Ecuador, and which marked the beginning of his career as a solo artist.

== Years of popularity ==
Jinsop's height of popularity was in the years 1973–1978, which is referred to as the epoch of "modern music" in Ecuador. At this time he sang songs written by Luis Padilla, Gustavo Pacheco, and covered the songs of James Brown, Simon and Garfunkel, Paul Anka, etc.

At eighteen he moved to Guayaquil at the home of the composer and musician Gustavo Pacheco, a member of the group Boddega, who composed the following songs for Jinsop: "Ven chiquilla ven" (Come see, girl), "Rosas y claveles" (Roses and carnations), "Volvamos a empezar" (Let's start over), "Extraño" (Strange), "Hay un motivo por vivir" (There's a reason for living), and "Silvy" which was dedicated to his wife. The songwriter Luis Padilla wrote the song "Estrellita solitaria" (Lonely star) for Jinsop. Although Jinsop had some doubt because he sang Spanish-language songs with an accent, the producer Efrén Avilés explained to him that people liked his sound, and so they recorded these songs at the Ifesa studio, and Jinsop was widely accepted and praised.

In 1973 he recorded his first album "Mi Oraciòn" (My Prayer) in the Ifesa and Orion studios (with music by the orchestra of Hector "Manito" Bonilla), which included hits such as: "Los campos verdes" (Green Fields), "Ven chiquilla ven" (Come see, girl), "Mi bella niña" (My beautiful girl), "Yo pienso que tu eres la mujer" (I think you're the woman), "Silvy", and "Atar un lazo arriba de un rosal" (cover version of "Tie a Yellow Ribbon 'Round the Ole Oak Tree").

In his second album appeared the songs: "Estrellita solitaria" (Lonely star), "Caballo de acero" (cover version of "Iron horse", original by Christie), "Rosas y Claveles" (Roses and carnations), "Volvamos a empezar" (Let's start over) among others.

In the 1980s he gave up music for several years. In 1986 he became an Ecuadorian citizen under the government of President León Febres Cordero. He moved to the United States to work for some years, but returned to Ecuador where he said he wanted to spend the last years of his life. He divorced his wife who stayed in the U.S. with two of his sons.

He continued to make music, and in 2011, suffering from lung problems, and on the advice of his doctors, he moved to a neighborhood named María Auxiliadorato in Ayangue, Santa Elena, Ecuador which is known for its hot springs. He moved to a beach-side inn with his youngest son Alexander, in hopes that the salty air of the beach would help him breathe better. He also suffered from a heart condition.

His last performances were in Guayaquil on March 8, 2012, at the Simon Bolivar Convention Center alongside the Spanish singer Jeanette and the Argentine singer Elio Roca. He also performed on June 9, 2012, for Father's Day at the Hotel Oro Verde in Machala with the Uruguayan band Los Iracundos, Los Golpes, and the Argentine singer Leonardo Favio.

== Death ==
His friend Arturo Cisneros said he missed a call from Jinsop June 24, 2012 at 3:50 am. He said he would forever wonder what Jinsop wanted to talk to him about at that hour. Later that morning, Jinsop was found in his home dead from cardiac arrest by his son Alexander. Three weeks before his death, Jinsop's former wife Sylvia died of pancreatic cancer.

The Guayaquilean songwriter and musician Gustavo Pacheco said that only three days before Jinsop's death, they had spoken about organizing a tour in August in New York, Los Angeles, Washington, and Chicago. Due to Jinsop's untimely death that tour would never happen.

Jinsop's body was buried on June 26, 2012, at 5:00 pm, at the General Cemetery of Guayaquil.

== List of popular songs ==
- La casa del sol naciente
- Silvy
- Yo Pienso Que Tu Eres La Mujer
- Mi Bella Niña
- Rosas y Claveles
- Papá
- Dulzura Mia
- Mi Oración
- Tu Huella
- Tú me provocas
- Atar un Lazo Arriba de un Rosal
- Dulzura Mía
- Ven Chiquilla Ven
- Puppy Love Son Tus Besos La Razón
- Atar Lazos Arriba De Un Rosal
- Un León Se Escapo De Su Jaula
- Pasaje de Ida
- Caballo de Acero
- Cuando Estas Conmigo
- Reflexiones
- Las Doncellas
- Volvamos a Empezar
- Estrellita Solitaria
- Campos Verdes
