= Huang Yiguang =

Chinese-Mexican politician and aviator

- 黃逸光
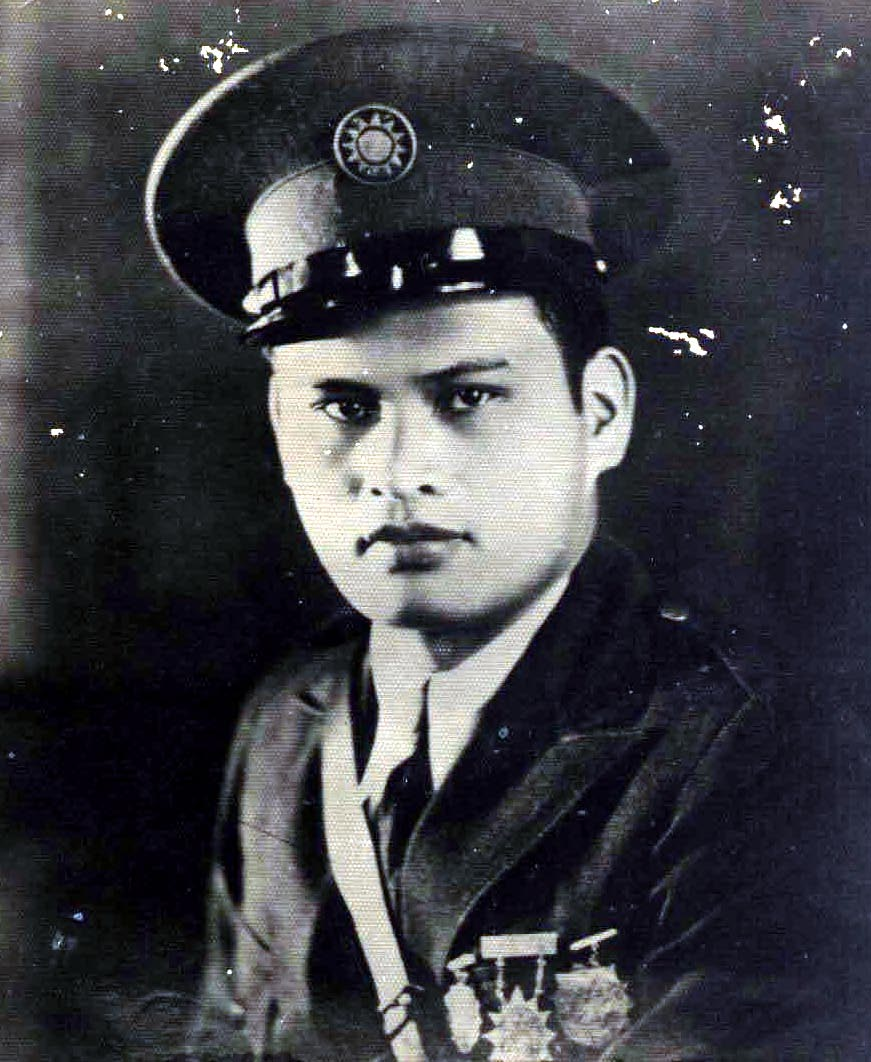
- Born: Mexico
- Died: December 17, 1940; China
- Military career
- Allegiance: (Taiwan) Republic of China
- Branch: Republic of China Air Force
- Conflicts: Second Sino-Japanese War †

Huang Yiguang (simplified Chinese: 黄逸光; traditional Chinese: 黃逸光; pinyin: Huáng Yìguāng) was a Mexican-born Chinese politician, aviator, and explorer. He was born into a well-connected and wealthy family in Mexico and served as a pilot in the Chinese air force during World War II.

He took part in one of a number of assassination attempts on the life of the Chinese politician Wang Jingwei, who collaborated with Japan during their occupation of China from 1937 to 1945. An aviator and explorer, he travelled widely with strong connections with the Chinese community in the United Kingdom. A former associate of Wang, he was welcomed in Wang's inner circle, but his assassination attempt failed when his radio equipment was discovered. He was executed by the Empire of Japan on 17 December 1940.
