= Quintín Quintana =

Chinese Peruvian Chilean, merchant and police detective

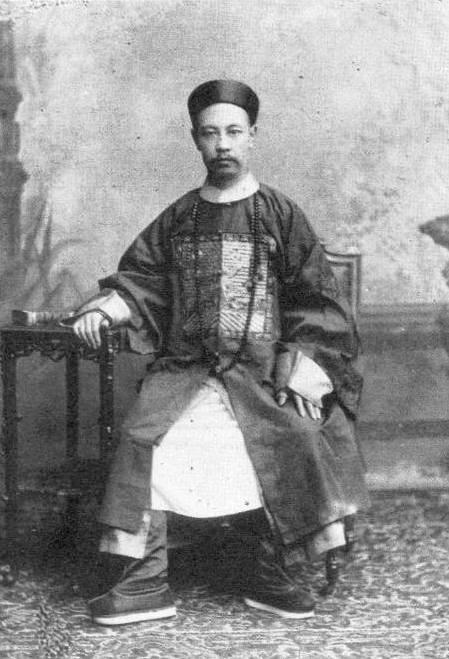
- Born: Liu Tang Sin Shin c. 1845/50; Qing Empire
- Died: 1902 (aged 52–57); Chile
- Occupations: Merchant, police detective

Quintín Quintana Lauchen (c. 1845/50 – 1902), born Liu Tang Sin Shin, Leotàn Sin-Shin, or Leo Shin, was a Chinese-Peruvian, later Chinese-Chilean, merchant and police detective. Born in China, he worked as a coolie in Peru and took a Spanish-language name. During the War of the Pacific, fought by Peru and Bolivia against Chile, Quintana joined the Chilean intelligence service and led a Chinese émigré collaboration effort against the Peruvian government.

== Early life and arrival in Peru ==
Quintana was born in China in the later half of the 1840s, but was brought in 1866 to Ica, Peru, where he became one of the more than 100,000 Chinese nationals taken from China to become slave laborers in Peru. Quintín was sold to a wealthy landowner as an indentured servant and was given a 20-year contract, for which he received two Peruvian sols per year, and his employer's surname, Quintana. In 1874, Quintana completed all the work his contract required of him. Thereafter he became both a successful merchant, owning two farms and two storefronts, and an influential member of the Chinese Peruvian community. He was described in the 1880s by a Chilean journalist as "a kind of Rothschild of this yellow tribe".

== War of the Pacific ==
In August 1880, the Chilean government decided to launch an amphibious attack into northern Peru to destroy its sugar plantations. The command of this attack was given to Patricio Lynch, a navy officer who had previously requested such an operation. Lynch's force landed at Chimbote on 10 September 1880 and, after local plantation owners refused to pay a war tax to protect their property, burned the plantations. In the process, he freed hundreds of Chinese coolies, who joined his force as guides and raiders. (Note: In the years after the War of the Pacific, Lynch's Chinese auxiliaries would be maligned as looters and raiders.)

In November, Chilean forces under the command of Colonel José Domingo Amunátegui Borgoño reached Ica, again followed by freed Chinese coolies, and were welcomed by Ica's ex-coolie Chinese merchants. Quintana hosted and befriended Colonel Amunátegui, who became the godfather of one of Quintana's children, and hosted several Chilean officers in his home. When Chilean forces continued their march north, Quintana sent his family south and out of Peru, and himself boarded a Chilean warship to follow the Chileans. He and some 3,000 other Chinese men arrived with 25,000 Chileans at Lurín, 15 miles (24 km) from Lima, on 25 December.

At Lurín, on 11 January 1881, between 400 and 1,000 Chinese men led by Quintana gathered before a shrine to Guan Yu, a Chinese god of war, drank a rooster's blood, and swore an oath of allegiance to Chile, to follow Quintana, and to free Chinese slaves. These men, many of them veterans of the Opium Wars and Taiping Rebellion, organized themselves into the Vulcan Legion (Spanish: Legión Vulcano) and joined the command of Chilean general Manuel Baquedano, then preparing for the Lima campaign. They served primarily as porters and caregivers, but were also proficient with the use of dynamite and thus cleared mines and blasted for water wells. They saw combat at the Battle of Chorrillos and Battle of Miraflores from 13 to 15 January, where they demolished obstacles and fought the Peruvians with captured weapons.

After Lima was occupied by the Chileans later in 1881, Quintana took up residence in Callao. There, Quintana, in collaboration with Amunátegui, now in command of the city, began organizing and hiring out Chinese laborers to plantations in northern Peru for the Chileans. He was prominent enough that British diplomat Spenser St. John, himself familiar with coolie labor, wrote of Quintana as being a leader in a new slave trade. Chinese workers were, however, now laboring in better conditions, for better salaries, and for Chinese bosses.

== Move to Chile ==
Quintana continued to work for the Chilean occupation government until 1883, at which point he settled down in Santiago and worked for the municipal police as a detective. In 1888, Quintana was awarded 2,000 Chilean pesos for his services during the War of the Pacific by order of Chilean President José Manuel Balmaceda.

Quintana became known in Santiago for his fashion sense, his relationships with journalists, and the fear he struck into criminals.

== Death and legacy ==
Quintana died in 1902. Chilean historian Marcelo Segall called him an "oriental Spartacus, a vibrant and audacious speaker who inspired his compatriots".
