= Jo Matumoto =

- Pitcher
- Born: February 5, 1971 (age 55); São Paulo, Brazil
- Bats: Left Throws: Left
- Stats at Baseball Reference

Jo Matumoto (born February 5, 1971) is a Brazilian former professional baseball player. He is a left-handed pitcher.

Matumoto was born in Brazil and is of Japanese descent. He emerged from complete obscurity, signed by the Toronto Blue Jays in 2007 as an undrafted free agent at the age of 36. Matumoto's wife had contacted agent Randy Hendricks by email as she desperately searched for someone in North America to give Matumoto an opportunity. Hendricks arranged tryouts for him and he was subsequently signed. Matumoto did not speak any English at that time. He became a free agent at the end of the 2008 season.

Matumoto played in the corporate leagues in Japan for Mitsubishi Heavy Industries, NKK, and Yamaha. He then played for Brazilian club Nippon Blue Jays—a team unaffiliated with the Toronto Blue Jays, but founded by a former Toronto Blue Jays farm team player, fellow Brazilian Jose Pett.

Matumoto began playing for the Brazilian national team in 1995 and was named the Most Valuable Player (MVP) in the 2005 South American Games when he led Brazil to a victory over Venezuela. He was considered the ace of the national team. Matumoto pitches with a three-quarters delivery, throwing in the high 80s with a solid slider. His best pitch was a screwball.
