= Carlos Moncayo =

Ecuadorian businessman (born 1981)

- Born: June 10, 1981; Quito, Ecuador
- Education: MBA
- Alma mater: Northwestern University Kellogg - HKUST Business School
- Occupation: CEO of Inspectorio
- Website: https://supplychain.inspectorio.com/

Carlos Moncayo (Simplified Chinese 卡罗斯) is an Ecuadorian businessman best known for being co-founder and CEO of Asiam Business Group.

== Early life ==
Moncayo was born in Quito, Ecuador. He studied law at the Catholic University of Ecuador but took a break from his education to start Asiam Business Group. Despite not completing his undergraduate studies, he was admitted and received his MBA from Kellogg - HKUST Business School, being the first candidate to be admitted in this program without an undergraduate degree. Besides attending Kellogg he has also attended Willamette University, Stanford Graduate School of Business, CEIBS (China Europe International Business School) and Yale University.

== Career ==
In 2003, Moncayo co-founded, with his two brothers Luis and Fernando Moncayo, Asiam Business Group, an offshore manufacturing management company headquartered in China with sourcing offices in Vietnam, India and Pakistan. Moncayo is CEO of Asiam. He is also a co-founder and director of Startups Ventures, an organization that supports the education, networking and finance of entrepreneurs in Ecuador. In 2015, Carlos along with his brothers founded the SaaS company Inspectorio, and is its CEO.

He has appeared or been quoted in media outlets including Financial Times and BBC News.

== Accomplishments ==
Moncayo was selected as Asia’s Best Young Entrepreneur in 2009 by BusinessWeek magazine readers. being the first non-Asian to receive this honor. He was also named Business Man of the Year by the Ecuadorian Chinese Chamber of Commerce in 2009.

Moncayo is the youngest permanent member of the World Entrepreneurship Forum, an invitation-only global think tank under the patronage of French President Nicolas Sarkozy where 100 prominent entrepreneurs, academicians and political decision makers from across the globe offer recommendations on how to foster entrepreneurship.

In 2010, he was selected New York City Venture Fellow, a program founded by New York City Mayor, Michael Bloomberg, targeted towards assisting rising international entrepreneurs to develop scalable businesses with global impact. He is the youngest Latin American CEO to join the G-50 (Grupo de los Cincuenta) forum. In 2012, he was named Young Global Leader by the World Economic Forum.

Moncayo appeared on Ideas Exchange, a series from the BBC that pairs up business leaders from around the world to discuss the business landscape and their secrets to success. He was paired on an episode with Argentine-Spanish entrepreneur Martin Varsavsky.
