= Reishin Kawai =

Munenori Kawai (1931–2010) was an 8th dan aikido practitioner and acupuncturist, who held the roles of president of the South American Aikido Federation and vice-president of the International Aikido Federation. He was responsible for the introduction of aikido to Brazil in 1963.

During his boyhood his health was fragile, which led him to receive acupuncture treatment, and to practice Sumo wrestling and Kenjutsu. In his youth he became an uchi-deshi for 7 years in the household of Torataro Saito, who taught him oriental medicine – as well as Daito-ryu Aikijujutsu and Ueshiba-ryu (!) Aiki-Budo. Technically, Kawai's foundation was therefore old school, in line with that of Gozo Shioda (Yoshinkan) and Morihiro Saito (Iwama).

Subsequently, he studied at Tsukushoku University under the tutelage of Mishimasa Nishizawa, graduating as an M.D. in Oriental Medicine. Kawai proceeded to become an associate professor in the subjects of general acupuncture and moxa technique at the Faculty of Oriental Medicine at Tsukushoku University. At the same time, he continued and updated his Aikijujutsu studies at the Aikikai Hombu Dojo – primarily studying with O-Sensei Morihei Ueshiba and his son Kisshomaru Ueshiba, as well as with Morihiro Saito on Sundays – for several years, before emigrating to Brazil and setting up practice as an M.D. there. Six years later he took a sabbatical to study Aikijujutsu and Aikido with Aritoshi Murashige, who encouraged him to establish a dojo in Brazil – which Kawai then proceeded to do.

In 1963, the Founder of Aikido, Morihei Ueshiba, presented him with the Shihan diploma (the official acknowledgement as a Master level teacher) in recognition of his high standards and of his efforts to disseminate Aikido – which Kawai Sensei continued to do, throughout all of South America. From 1976 to 1984 he was Vice President of The International Aikido Federation (IAF), subsequently becoming Director General of The South American Aikido Federation, and the official representative of Aikikai Hombu Dojo in that subcontinent. Throughout his life, Kawai and his students remained intensely loyal to Hombu Dojo.

In Brazil he married Leticia Okubo and became the father of two daughters, Cristina Okubo Kawai and Lilba Okubo Kawai 4⁰ Dan, and the grandfather of two grandchildren, Larissa Kawai de Oliveira and Matias Reishin Kawai de Oliveira 1⁰ Dan, concedendo o único homem da família Reishin Kawai.
