= Shinzaburo Takeda =

Japanese Mexican painter and printmaker (born 1935)

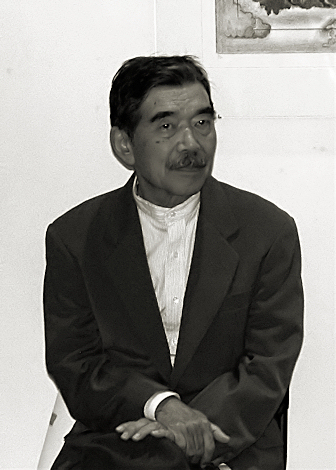
- Born: 1935 (age 90–91); Seto, Japan
- Died: Japanese
- Awards: Order of the Sacred Treasure

Shinzaburo Takeda is a Japanese-Mexican painter and printmaker. He is considered one of Oaxaca's most important artists. Takeda has lived in Mexico for over fifty years and trained several generations of Mexican artists, many of them indigenous Zapotecs and Mixtecs.

== Life and career ==
Takeda was born in 1935 in Seto, Japan and trained at the University of Fine Arts of Tokyo. In 1963, he visited Mexico, studying mural painting with Armando Carmona and Luis Nishizawa at the Academy of San Carlos in Mexico City. Later studying lithography with Francisco Vasquez at the Escuela Nacional de Artes Graficas.

In 1978 he moved to Oaxaca, where he became a professor of art at the Benito Juárez Autonomous University of Oaxaca. His students include notable artists, such as Fulgencio Lazo and Alejandro Santiago. He previously worked as a painter and graphic artist for the Museo Nacional de las Culturas. Since 1980 Takeda has been chair of the Department of Art at the Universidad Autónoma "Benito Juárez" de Oaxaca. The Bienal Nacional de Artes Gráficas Shinzaburo Takeda (National Biennale of Graphic Arts Shinzaburo Takeda) is held in his honor.
