= Hiromi Hayakawa =

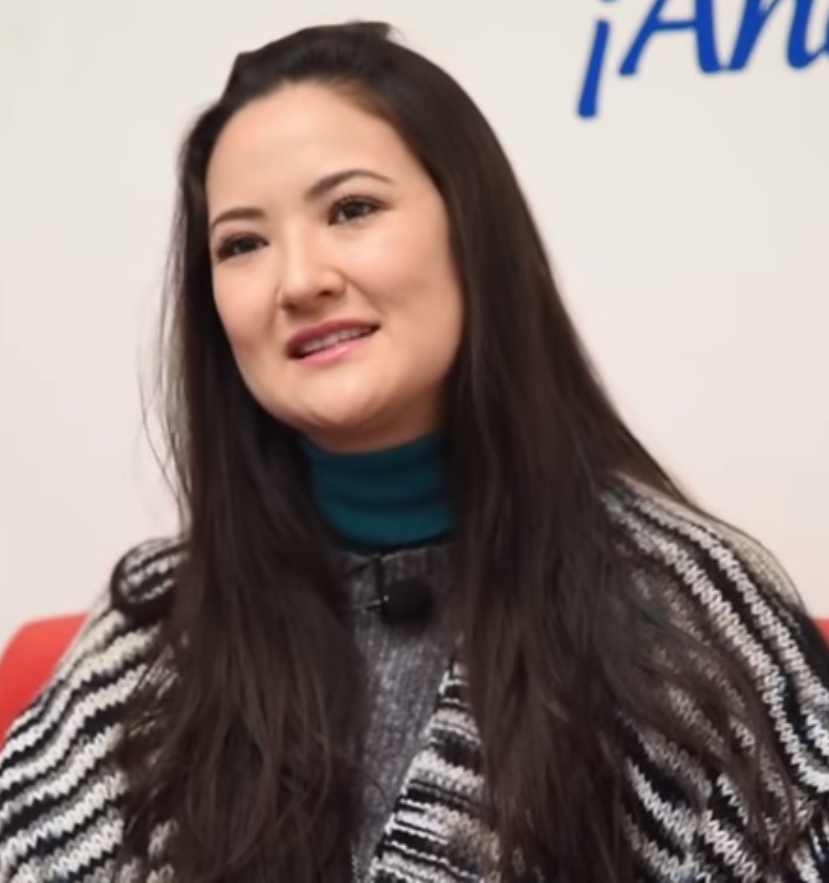
- Hayakawa in 2017
- Born: Marla Hiromi Hayakawa Salas; October 19, 1982; Fukuoka, Japan
- Died: September 27, 2017 (aged 34); Mexico City, Mexico
- Occupations: Actress, singer
- Years active: 2000–2017
- Television: La Academia
- Spouse: Fernando Santana (m. 2017)
- Children: 1
- Musical career
- Genres: Pop, Latin
- Instrument: Vocals
- Label: Independent

Marla Hiromi Hayakawa Salas (October 19, 1982 – September 27, 2017), known professionally as Hiromi Hayakawa, was a Japanese-born Mexican actress and singer who began her music career as a contestant in the reality show La Academia. She worked mostly in musical theatre but also had occasional television roles. Hayakawa was also a voice actress, who worked primarily on the Spanish American dub of films and series from the United States.

== Early life ==
Hiromi Hayakawa was born in Fukuoka, Japan to Alfonso Javier Hayakawa, who is of Japanese descent and a native of Torreón, Coahuila, and Lourdes Elsa Salas, from the city of Chihuahua, making her of both Japanese and Mexican descent. Her parents resided in Fukuoka while her father studied Industrial Engineering there. They returned to Mexico when Hiromi was only two and a half years old, and at the same time, her mother was pregnant with her second child, Kaori.

== Career ==
=== La Academia ===
When she attended a casting call for La Academia, Hayakawa scored 9.7 points out of a possible ten points. Though, before competing in La Academia, Hayakawa studied Industrial Engineering and Systems at the Monterrey Institute of Technology and Higher Education in Coahuila. She decided to attend the casting for La Academia because, as with most people who attend the castings, she saw it as a chance of pursuing a musical career.

Hayakawa left La Academia after the thirteenth concert; though she was later re-cast and became the sixth runner-up as the winner. The last song she sang as an official contestant was "La Playa" by La Oreja de Van Gogh. Two weeks after her expulsion, Hayakawa was given the opportunity to return to La Academia and become a finalist. Hayakawa and two other ex-students (Ricardo Hernández Quiñones and Dulce Lopez Rodriguez) were given a song which they had to perform in the next concert. The public would then vote on who they wanted to return to the finale instead of voting on who was going to be expelled. In the end Dulce Lopez Rodriguez won and went to the finale where she won 2nd place. One of the judges, Lolita Cortez, was very disappointed in the results.

=== Theater ===
Hayakawa is best known for her work on Mentiras: The Musical, based on the pop culture and music of the 1980s. She has played all of the main roles: Daniela, Dulce, Lupita, Yuri, Emmanuel and Manoella.

She is also known for her role as Mulan in 12 Princesas en Pugna, a satirical take on the Disney Princesses. Hayakawa has also worked on the Mexican adaptations of Peter Pan and Hairspray.

=== Voice acting ===
In 2012, she voiced Merida, the protagonist of Disney Pixar's Brave, for the Spanish American dub. She also was Sonata Dusk from Hasbro's Equestria Girls: Rainbow Rocks, Draculaura from Monster High, Bunny Blanc and Ginger Breadhouse from Ever After High.

== Personal life ==
In 2004, Hiromi Hayakawa participated in La Academia, she had a relationship with her ex-generation partner Carlos Rivera.

Hiromi Hayakawa was married to Fernando Santana from January 4, 2017, to September 27, 2017. Hayakawa also had a daughter with Santana.

== Death ==
Hayakawa was expecting a baby, due on October 21, 2017. On September 26, she was rushed to a hospital and was discovered to have lots of bleeding in the liver. Efforts were made to save the child, named Julieta, but she died at around 11:00 pm. Hayakawa died before noon, the following day. She was 34 years old. On September 28, Hayakawa and Julieta were cremated, and the ashes will remain in Mexico City with her husband.

== Filmography ==
=== Television ===
- El Chema
- La Academia
- Segunda oportunidad
- La vida es una canción
- Lo que callamos las mujeres
- A cada quien su santo
- Barrio Bravo (television film)

=== Voice acting ===
Hayakawa has worked on the Spanish American dubs of:

==== Television series ====
- My Babysitter's a Vampire – Sarah
- A.N.T. Farm – Jeanne / Vanessa
- Glee – Sugar Motta (Vanessa Lengies)
- Melrose Place – Abby Douglas
- Green Balloon Club – Lily Rose
- Zeke and Luther – Cherlene
- Sonny with a Chance – Payton
- Fimbles – Pom

==== Films ====
- Alicia a través del espejo – Alicia (Alice) (2016)
- My Babysitter's a Vampire – Sarah (2010)
- Harriet the Spy: Blog Wars – Marion Hawthorne (2010)
- Geek Charming – Hannah
- Los Muppets – Miss Piggy's receptionist (2011)
- Prom (Fin de curso) – Nova (2011)
- En la boda de mi hermana – Joan (2010)
- Alicia en el país de las maravillas – Alicia (2010)
- Skyrunners – Julie Gunn (2009)
- Mi Falso Prometido – Courtney (2009)
- Cita a ciegas – additional voices

==== Animated series ====
- Pokémon – Caitlin / additional voices (season 15)
- Jungla Sobre Ruedas – Zooter
- Barbie: Life in the Dreamhouse – Teresa (from season 2)
- Futurama – additional voices
- El Principito – Linéa
- Los Simpson – Gina Vendetti, Jenny, Nikki McKenna (season 24)
- Twinkle Toes – Prett Tall
- Stitch – Ángel
- Wibbly Pig – Scruffy pig
- Tellytales – Narrator
- Pearly – Ópalo
- Grojband – Mina Beff
- Los 7E – Reina Delicia
- Rescue Heroes – Ariel Flyer

==== Animated films ====
- La increíble historia del Niño de Piedra (2015) – additional voices
- Brave (Valiente) – Princess Merida
- Gnomeo y Julieta – Julieta
- Monster High: Una fiesta Tenebrosa – Draculaura
- Barbie: El secreto de las hadas – Taylor
- Barbie: Moda mágica en París – Delphine
- Barbie y las tres mosqueteras – Guest 1
- Los fantasmas de Scrooge – Martha Cratchit
- Lorax. En busca de la trúfula perdida – additional voices
- Barbie: Escuela de Princesas – Isla
- Barbie en una aventura de sirenas – Sirena Destino
- Barbie: La princesa y la estrella de pop – Barbie / Estrella de Pop Keira
- Cars 2 – additional voices
- My Little Pony: Equestria Girls – Rainbow Rocks – Sonata Dusk

==== Videogames ====
- Injustice 2 - Dr. Randall
- Disney Infinity - Merida/Alice
