= Kiyoto Ota =

Japanese-Mexican sculptor (born 1948)

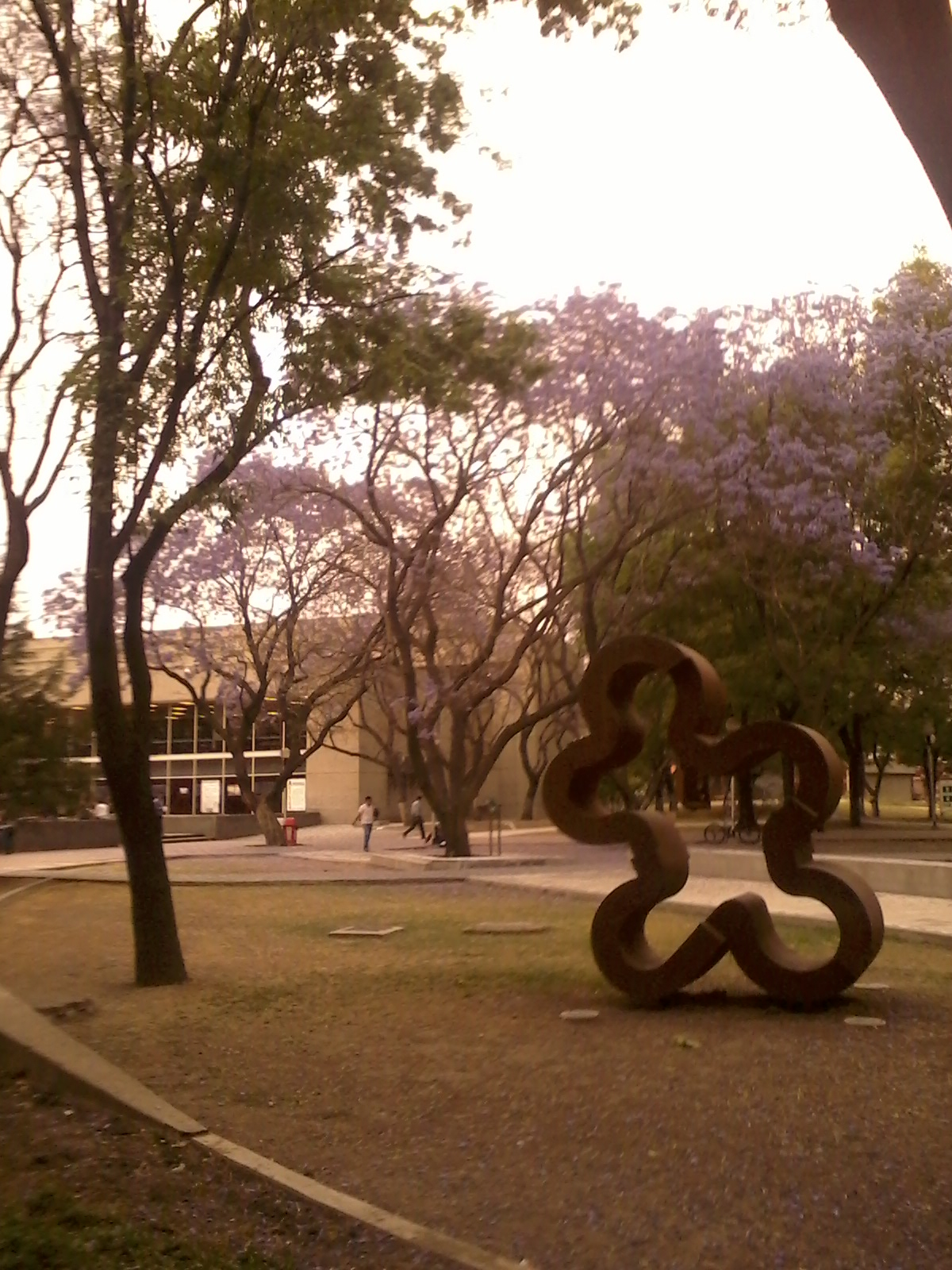
Spring Season, a sculpture by Ota in Mexico City.

Kiyoto Ota (太田 清人, Ōta Kiyoto; born 1948 in Sasebo, Nagasaki, Japan) is a Japanese-Mexican sculptor.

== Life ==
Kiyoto Ota studied at

- the School of Democratic Art of the Japanese Artistic Association in Tokyo (1967–1969)
- the Escuela Nacional de Pintura, Escultura y Grabado "La Esmeralda" of the INBA (1972–1977)
- the Centro de Investigación y Experimentación Plástica (Center of Investigation and Plastic Experimentation) of the INBA (1977~1979).

Ota moved to Mexico in 1972, currently living in Mexico City. He came to the country to study art and learn about Mexico and decided to stay.

== Artistry ==
He originally wanted to be a painter, but in Mexico his interest turned to sculpture, working in lead, stone, iron and wood.

For many years he sculpted directly into stone and wood. His more recent work has emphasized the interior of his sculptures, creating hollow spaces, often by joining pieces of wood in intricate ways. He believes the interior of these words guard the pieces’ energy. The exhibition 3 Casas Extraordinarias invites the onlooker to examine the interiors of three model houses. The three are made to be inhospitable, rather than comforting, such as the one that “rains” on the inside.

He is inclined toward primitive figures, generally circles and sphere, with a minimalist view. He contrasts his work with the abundance of things and technology today, believing it is necessary to look at simple and “real” things.

His preferred material is wood, stating it is synonymous with life, nature and fertility. This is in contrast to his former work in lead which he now describes as poisonous, inanimate and of death.

== Career ==
He has exhibited in Europe, the United States and various parts of Mexico.

- Mimi Gallery, Tokyo (1971)
- Museo de Arte Moderno (Museum of Modern Art), Mexico, D.F. (1986)
- Feria Expositum (Expositum), Mexico, D.F. (1990)
- Galería Arte Contemporáneo (Contemporary Art Gallery), Mexico, D.F. (1987 and 1992)
- Museo Regional (Regional Museum), Guadalajara, Jalisco (1987)
- Museo de Arte Contemporáneo (Museum of Contemporary Art) of Oaxaca (1995)
- Museo de Arte Carrillo Gil (Carrillo Gil Art Museum), Mexico, D.F.(1997).
- Galería Metropolitana (Metropolitan University Gallery), Mexico, D.F.(2006).

Ota teaches art at the Facultad de Arte y Diseño of the National Autonomous University of Mexico.
