= Dai-won Moon =

Mexican taekwondo practitioner (1942/1943–2026)

- Hangul: 문대원
- RR: Mun Daewon
- MR: Mun Taewŏn

Dai-won Moon (1942 or 1943 – 16 May 2026) was a South Korean-born Mexican martial artist. He was known as the Father of Mexican Taekwondo for introducing taekwondo to Mexico in 1969. Since then, taekwondo has become a popular sport in Mexico, with over 1.5 million taekwondo practitioners and 3,500 schools throughout the country.

== Life and career ==
Moon was born in the small village of Duk Hap, 200 km (120 mi) south of Seoul. His father, Chang Wook Moon worked in the administration of President Syngman Rhee. He became a black belt at the age of 16.

He graduated from Texas Tech University with a degree in architecture and originally had plans to settle in the United States. He competed in various American martial arts tournaments between 1963 and 1968. He was also an alumnus of Kyung Hee University.

Moon first arrived in Mexico in 1968 on an invitation from a friend. According to Moon during his first visit, "I'd teach, it was very tough and [the Mexican students] endured, that I liked, a lot of spirit, courage, attitude and devotion." On 22 May 1969, he arrived with intentions to stay and lived in the country since then. In 1975 he became a naturalized Mexican citizen. He later had four Mexican-born children.

In Mexico he established Moo Duk Kwan, a school to "make Mexican taekwondo one of the strongest in the world". From 1973, when the World Taekwondo Championships began, Mexico was represented by Moon's school. Until the sixth World Championship, in Copenhagen in 1983, he personally took, trained and bankrolled the Mexican athletes. In 1975, Moon promoted the creation of the Federación Mexicana de Taekwondo.

The association of Moo Duk Kwan schools numbers around 350. Moon taught over 300,000 students and 50,000 earned black belts, earning the title of “Gran Maestro".

Moon died in San Miguel de Allende, Guanajuato on 16 May 2026, at the age of 83.

== See also ==
- Taekwondo in Mexico
