= Alejandro Gómez Maganda =

Mexican politician

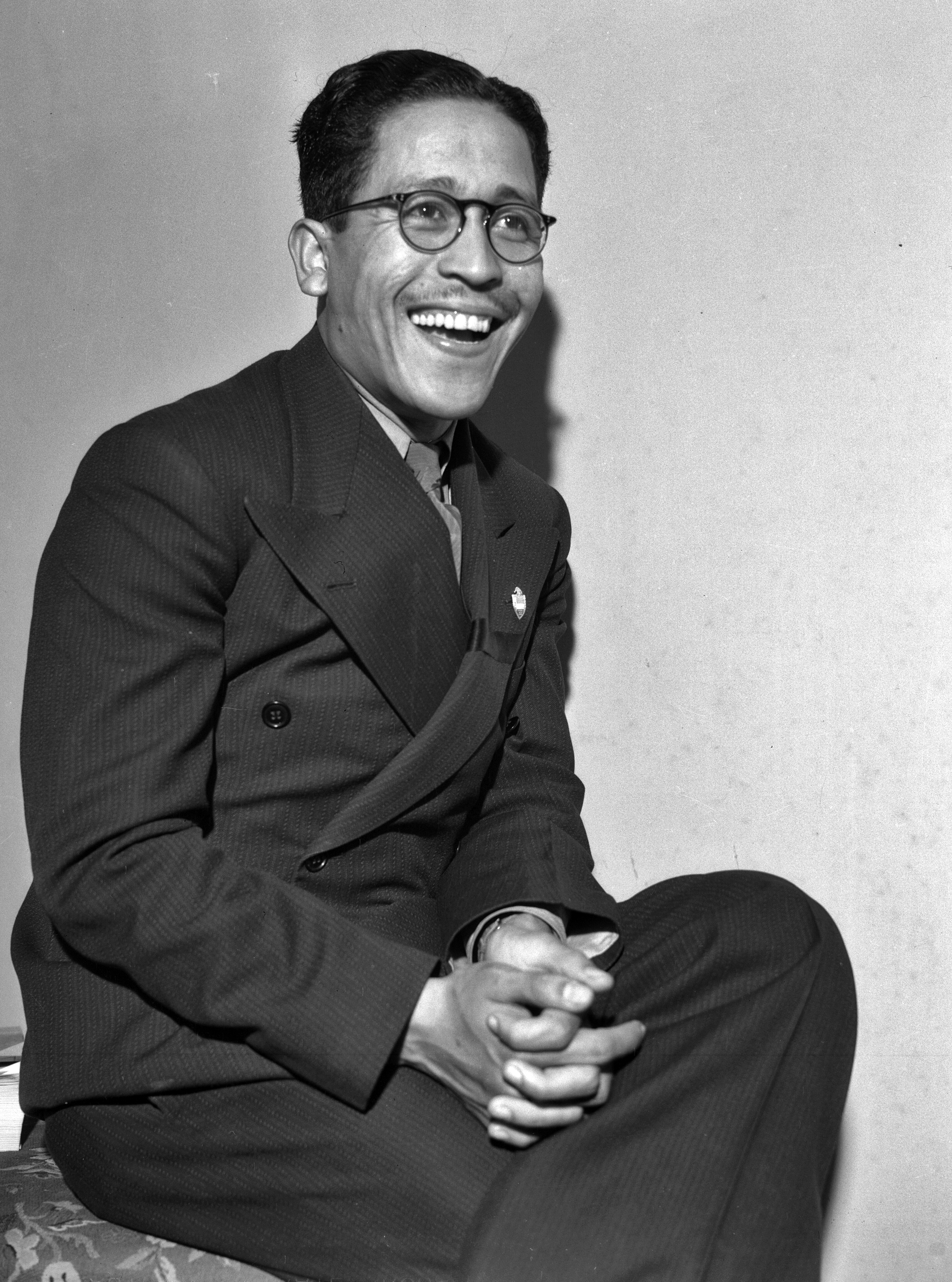

Governor of Guerrero
- In office April 1, 1951 – May 20, 1954
- Preceded by: Darío L. Arrieta Mateos
- Succeeded by: Baltazar R. Leyva Mancilla

Personal details
- Born: Alejandro Gómez Maganda; March 3, 1910 Arenal de Gómez, Guerrero, Mexico
- Died: September 14, 1984 (aged 74) Mexico City, Mexico
- Party: Institutional Revolutionary Party

Alejandro Gómez Maganda (March 3, 1910 – September 14, 1984) was a Mexican politician affiliated with the Institutional Revolutionary Party (PRI).

In the 1946 general election, Gómez Maganda was elected to the Chamber of Deputies to represent Guerrero's 4th district during the 40th session of Congress. During that term he served as president of the Chamber of Deputies in 1947.

He was later the governor of Guerrero from 1951 to 1954.
