= Su Muy Key =

Mexican vedette and dancer (1927–1951)

- Born: Rosa Su López; November 4, 1929; Mexico City, Mexico
- Died: November 10, 1951 (aged 22); Mexico City, Mexico
- Occupations: film actress, dancer
- Years active: 1948–1951

Su Muy Key (November 4, 1929 – November 10, 1951) was a Mexican vedette, actress and dancer of Chinese descent. She was one of the first Burlesque performers in Mexico. She was nicknamed "Muñequita China" ("Chinese Doll").

== Biography ==
Su had a sister, Margo Su, who was an actress, businesswoman and owner of the famous Teatro Blanquita in Mexico City. During her career Su acted in several Mexican films like the La bandida (1948), Carta brava (1950), Mujeres de teatro (1951) and Especialista en señoras(1951). As a vedette and burlesque performer, she worked in numerous theaters and cabarets of the time. Her famous night show consisted of painting her body with silver paint and remaining immobile as a statue, and then dancing oriental dances.

Her sister, Margo Su, followed her footsteps in the movies, participating in numerous films and telenovelas.

=== Death ===
It is also said that between Serna, Su Muy Key and Cervantes a violent scene arose because the businessman seemed to go to fulfill his threats, that the tragedy happened after Cervantes and Serna, in the presence of Su Muy Key had put this one in the dilemma of deciding for either. Cervantes's absence in all investigations is based on the fact that, according to the same reports, the businessman returned to the neighboring apartment from where he had seen the arrival of the lovers and, realizing the magnitude of the tragedy, decided to remain hidden, to avoid complications.

== Comments ==
Su's sister Margo Su offered a profile of her sister in her book Alta Frivolidad (1990):

"Rosa's skin is white and soft; With the lights of the theater she looks pearly. She's tall and with long arms, when she dances them moves sweetly and with elegance, gives the sensation of being in the sea. Her hair is black, crow-winged color with bluish flashes. She is beautiful. Even her name is cute: Su Muy Key. Muy Key means "Rose", in Chinese. The worst happened to her: she was labeled as a "Exótica" despite the fact that she is the opposite: Her dance is refined, ethereal, nothing ties her to the cry of African jungle or the sensuality of the Pacific islands. Su Muy Key is the mystical, elegant, mysterious and deep dance. She replaced Tongolele in the cabaret Club Verde with everything and the spectacular advertisements in the press and the huge posters stuck in all the streets of the city and, of course, her name was preceded by the fashionable adjective: The Exótica Su Muy Key. As sometimes happens, Rosa is totally different in her daily life to the figure of the scenes. She is simple and sweet in her dealings, an untiring accountant of jokes, she hates fame because she can no longer go to the market to choose her ingredients (she is a splendid cook) or stop talking to the butcher or the vegetable vendor. She goes out into the street without a drop of makeup on her face and dressed in simplicity, which seems wrapped in furs and silks. Either way, people are stunned in her wake, like an apparition. She has a lot of "angel" and a great personality".

== Filmography ==
- La bandida (1948)
- Carta brava (1949)
- Especialista en señoras (1951)
- Mujeres de teatro (1951)

== Bibliography ==
- Su, Margo; Leduc, Renato (1989). Alta Frivolidad. Cal y Arena. ISBN 9789684931879.
