= Nancy Taira =

Mexican actress

Nancy Taira (born Nancy Fabiola Saori Taira Yshizo; November 10, 1977 in Mexico City, Mexico) is a Mexican actress.

== Background ==
Taira's parents are both Japanese. Before enrolling and studying for three years in Televisa's Centro de Educación Artística (CEA) where she studied acting, she received a Bachelor's Degree in Communications.

== Career ==
Taira debuted as an actress in Mujer, Casos de la Vida Real and obtained her first major role in Corazones al límite, where she played Coral, one of the stellar characters in the telenovela. She later played a small role in Yo amo a Juan Querendon. Her latest appearance was in the Mexican series El Pantera, where she played Ana. She starred in 2011 the Telenovela Una familia con suerte.

== Filmography ==
Television
Year	Title	Role	Notes
2002	Mujer, Casos de la Vida Real		"El poder de la fe"
2004	Corazones al límite	Coral	Supporting role
2005	Los perplejos	Herself	
2007	Yo amo a Juan Querendon	Sun Yu Yamamoto	
2007	¿Y ahora qué hago?	Chinese businessman's wife	"Si Houdini pudo... yo también"
2009	El Pantera	Ana	Supporting role
2013	No se Aceptan Devoluciones	Amante Oriental	
2018	Run Coyote Run	La Mafia China	
