= Alberto Arai =

Mexican architect (1915–1959)

Alberto T. Arai (March 29, 1915 – May 25, 1959) was a Mexican architect, theorist and writer, of Japanese descent.

Born in Mexico City, the fourth son of a Japanese ambassador in Mexico, Kinta Arai, Alberto T. Arai studied also philosophy, espousing neo-Kantianism and becoming politically a socialist artist. He became a supporter of Functionalism, with its emphasis on the social applications of architecture, and was also a founder, with Enrique Yañez, of the Unión de Arquitectos Socialistas (1938), helping to draw up a socialist theory of architecture. He was one of the most active participants and attempted to put his socialist theory into practice on two unexecuted projects in the same year: the building for the Confederation of Mexican Workers and the Ciudad Obrera de México, both with Enrique Guerrero and Raúl Cacho (1937), and his social worries on the unexecuted General Hospital project (to be built in the city of Leon, Gto).

He was one of the commissioners to take topographical records from the recent discovered Mayan ruins of Bonampak, in an expedition organized by the National Institute of Fine Arts (1949).

His urbanistic knowledge give him the opportunity to make urban planning to several cities along the country. Also he developed the theory of architectural regionalism, which attempt the use of material resources and take care of the human needs of each particular area.

Later, when Mexico opted for a developmental policy, Arai became a standard-bearer for nationalism in architecture. He re-evaluated traditional building materials, such as tree trunks, bamboo, palm leaves and lianas, using them in a plan for a country house that was adapted to the warm, damp climate of the Papaloapan region, and various essays to improve the country and popular houses. The building of the Ciudad Universitaria, Mexico City, gave him his greatest architectural opportunity when he designed the "Frontones" de Ciudad Universitaria (1952). In these he used the volcanic stone of the area to great effect in truncated pyramid shapes inspired by Pre-Columbian pyramids. This was his contribution to the early landscaping-architecture, by using the volcanoes surrounding the view as a theme for his design. His numerous books and articles addressed conceptual problems in Mexican architecture and art. His last building was the clubhouse (Kaikan) of the Japanese Association, see Japanese community of Mexico City, who was inspired on ancient Japanese and ancient Mexican architectural design, but with modern techniques and materials, successfully a modern looking piece.
