= Eduardo Auyón =

Mexican artist (1935–2015)

Eduardo Auyón (Chinese: 欧阳民; 1935 – October 8, 2015) was an artist and cultural promoter.

== Life and career ==
Auyón was born in Canton, China in 1935. He moved to Mexicali, Mexico in the 1960s. He was a professor at Escuela de Bellas Artes de Mexicali.

He published "Los chinos en Baja California. Ayer y hoy" (1971), and "El dragón en el desierto. Los pioneros chinos en Mexicali" (1991).

Auyón died in Mexicali, Baja California on October 8, 2015.
