= Axel Didriksson =

Mexican writer and academic

Axel Didriksson Takayanagui is a writer, a professor at Universidad Nacional Autónoma de México (UNAM) and a member of the board of the UNESCO Chair on Regional Integration and University at the Autonomous University. He is also the coordinator between the Instituto Internacional para la Educación Superior en América Latina y el Caribe and the UNESCO Chair, as well as the director of the Center of Studies at the university (CESU).

== Education and career ==
Didriksson is of Swedish and Japanese descent. He is an alumnus of the UNAM and has a PhD in Economics which he received from the National Autonomous University of Mexico (UNAM) University of London:this date is incorrect (Graduate studies in education). He has written numerous books and articles for El Universal, La Jornada and U-2000.

Didriksson was the former Secretary of Education of the Mexican Federal District.

== Awards ==
- Iberoamerican Award for the Promotion and Development of Technologicy, 1995.
- Mérito Universitario medal. Universidad de San Buenaventura, Cali, Colombia.
- Al Gran Comendador medal. Universidad Misael Saracho, Bolivia, 2000.

== Sources ==
- (in Spanish) Profile at Universidad Veracruzana
