= Úrsula Murayama =

Mexican actress (born 1972)

- Born: 1972 (age 52–53); Mexico City, Mexico
- Occupation: Actress
- Years active: 1997-present
- Known for: Role of Jacinta in telenovela Esmeralda
- Relatives: Noé Murayama (unknown)

Úrsula Murayama (Spanish pronunciation: [uɾsula murajama] born 1972 in Mexico City, Mexico) is a Mexican actress. She currently lives in Spain.

== Biography and career ==
Murayama is the best known for the role of Jacinta in Esmeralda (1997). The main heroine of this telenovela, Esmeralda, was played by Leticia Calderón. In Esmeralda also appeared Noé Murayama.

It is possible that he was a relative of Úrsula.

She also appeared in Rosalinda (1999). The main heroine in this telenovela, Rosalinda Pérez Romero, was played by Thalía.

Her other roles were in:

- Hijos del viento – Princess Tizcuitl
- Sin Azul – Laura
- Mi hijo Arturo
- Las 13 rosas
- Yacaranday
- Tres veces Sofía
- Romántica Obsesión
- Morir dos veces
- Pelea de gallos – Dolores
- El caso Wanninkhof
- Padre no hay más que uno

Hijos del viento is a film about one Aztec princess, called Tizcuitl.

In Sin Azul, Úrsula played Laura, who after a painful miscarriage journeys to her grandmother's town in search of a remedy to heal her trauma in Xochimilco.

== See also ==
- Japanese community of Mexico City
