= Carlos Morimoto =

Carlos Eduardo Morimoto is the author of Kurumin, a Linux distribution based on Knoppix. It was the most popular Linux distribution in Brazil. After almost ending the project, due to many complaints from users in his forums and technical problems, mostly caused by the fact that Kurumin was based on Debian unstable, which is not targeted to non-experienced users, and was the majority of Kurumin users, Morimoto improved it and it reached its success. In 2008, Morimoto abandoned the project for personal reasons.

A new group of developers attempted to continue the project, now called "Kurumin NG", and based in Kubuntu, when Leandro Santos, the developer of Kalango Linux (another distro based in Kurumin) joined efforts with Morimoto to develop the new version of Kurumin. But this new effort was short-lived and was shut down some time later.

He is also the author of several books about hardware and software, especially Linux, all published in Brazil, his home country. He sells books and Linux CDs. Much (if not all) of his work is free content.

After abandoning Kurumin, Morimoto gradually left his other projects: "Guia do Hardware" website, then the books, and finally, all his material belongings, choosing to leave worldly affairs and live his Hare-Krishna religion full-time. Morimoto changed his name to "Caitanya Chandra Dasa" and lives near Porto Alegre, Rio Grande do Sul.

== Published books ==
- Upgrade e Manutenção de Hardware (ISBN 85-86846-75-9; paperback; 2001)
- Entendendo e Dominando o Linux (ISBN 85-89535-33-9; paperback; 2004)
