= Immigrant generations =

Generational status of immigrants and their descendants

In sociology, people who permanently resettle to a new country are considered immigrants, regardless of the legal status of their citizenship or residency. The United States Census Bureau (USCB) uses the term "generational status" to refer to the place of birth of an individual or an individual's parents. First-generation immigrants are the first foreign-born family members to gain citizenship or permanent residency in the country. People beyond the first generation are not "immigrants" in the strictest sense of the word and, depending on local laws, may have received citizenship from birth. The categorization of immigrants into generations helps sociologists and demographers track how the children and subsequent generations of immigrant forebears compare to sections of the population that do not have immigrant background or to equivalent generations of prior eras.

== First generation ==
According to USCB, the first generation of immigrants is composed of individuals who are foreign-born, which includes naturalized citizens, lawful permanent residents, protracted temporary residents (such as long-staying foreign students and migrant workers, but not tourists and family visitors), humanitarian migrants (such as refugees and asylees), and even unauthorized migrants.

In some definitions, however, those born to at least one immigrant parent are considered "first generation" – or rather, first generation of an immigrant's descendants (i.e., second generation from the USCB definition).

Although some struggle, many first generation immigrants learn to speak the language of their new country fluently.

=== 1.5 generation ===
The term 1.5 generation or 1.5G, although not widely used, refers to first-generation immigrants who immigrated to the new country before or during early adolescence, typically between the ages of 6 and 12. They earn the label the "1.5 generation" because while they spend their formative years engaging in assimilation and socialization in the new country, they often still maintain their native language, cultural traits and even national identity from their country of origin. Often, in the case of small children, a battle of linguistic comprehension occurs between their academic language and the language spoken at home. Their identity is, thus, a combination of new and old culture and tradition. Sociologist Rubén Rumbaut was among the first to use the term to examine outcomes among those arriving in the United States before adolescence, but since then the term has expanded to include foreign students, as well as other unique individuals.

Identity is an essential defining characteristic of a person, and can affect how they interact with society. Identity formation commonly takes place during adolescence, and the ages of 4 and 8 are described as important for developing a sense of ethnic identity. As such, depending on the age of immigration, the community where they settle, the amount of time they spent in the education system in their native country, and other factors, 1.5 generation individuals identify with their countries of origin to varying degrees. The extent to which this cultural diffusion remains variable is further due to acculturation, the process that occurs when groups of individuals of different cultures come into continuous first-hand contact, which changes the original culture patterns of either or both groups. However, their identification is affected by their experiences growing up in the new country. 1.5G individuals feel a stronger curiosity about their heritage culture than later generations. 1.5G individuals are often bilingual and may find it easier to assimilate into local culture and society than people who immigrate as adults. Many 1.5 generation individuals also feel bi-cultural, combining both cultures: that of the country of origin and that of the new country.

Because 1.5 generation individuals immigrate during their adolescence at a time of identity formation, this may contribute to their curiosity about other groups that are different from their own. Andray Domsey reports that this curiosity makes them more open to accepting and adopting a culture foreign to them. Although the curiosity of foreign cultures could easily destabilize their recently-developed ethnic identity, 1.5 generation adolescents may be more inclined to integrate into their new country's culture as a means of survival. After all, in the example of immigrants to the United States, classroom instruction is given in English, and, especially for adolescents attending public schools, their peers will only speak English. However, the ease of acculturation is dependent on age; the older an individual is when they immigrated to the United States, the harder it will be for them to assimilate into American society. As such, even if a Generation 1.5 individual wanted to fully assimilate into American society—which might result in a greater earning potential—their age would make the process difficult. Gindelsky's findings further demonstrate that acculturation is more often sought after due to the associated increase in earning potential and for survival, and less so simply due to curiosity.

=== 1.75 and 1.25 generations ===
Rubén G. Rumbaut has coined the terms "1.75 generation" and "1.25 generation" immigrants, for children who are closer to birth or full adulthood when they immigrate. Children who arrive in their early childhood (ages 0–5) are referred to as 1.75 generation immigrants since their experiences are closer to a true 2nd-generation immigrant who was born in the country they live in: they retain virtually no memory of their country of birth, were too young to go to school to learn to read or write in the parental language or dialect in the home country, typically learn the language or dialect of the country they immigrate to without an accent and are almost entirely socialized there. Children who arrive in their adolescent years (ages 13–17) are referred to as 1.25 generation immigrants because their experiences are closer to the first generation of adult immigrants than to the native born second generation.

== Second generation ==
The term "second-generation" extends the concept of first-generation by one generation. As such, the term exhibits the same type of ambiguity as "first-generation," as well as additional ones. Like "first-generation immigrant", the term "second-generation" can refer to a member of either:

- The second generation of a family to inhabit, but the first natively born in, a country, or
- The second generation born in a country (i.e. "third generation" in the above definition)

In the United States, among demographers and other social scientists, "second generation" refers to the U.S.-born children of foreign-born parents.

The term second-generation immigrant attracts criticism due to it being an oxymoron. Namely, critics say, a "second-generation immigrant" is not an immigrant, since being "second-generation" means that the person is born in the country and the person's parents are the immigrants in question. The labeling of immigrant generations is further complicated by the fact that immigrant generations may not correspond to the genealogical generations of a family. For instance, if a family of two parents and their two adult children immigrate to a new country, members in both generations of this family may be considered "first generation" by the former definition, as both parents and children were foreign-born, adult, immigrants. Likewise, if the two parents had a third child later on, this child would be of a different immigrant generation from that of its siblings. For every generation, the factor of mixed-generation marriages further complicates the issue, as a person may have immigrants at several different levels of his or her ancestry.

These ambiguities notwithstanding, generation labeling is frequently used in parlance, news articles, and reference articles without deliberate clarification of birthplace or naturalization. It may or may not be possible to determine, from context, which meaning is intended.

2nd generation immigrants are commonly more engulfed in their new culture. They likely learn the language their new country speaks and live closer to the social norm than their 1st gen. parents.

=== 2.5 generation ===
When demographers and other social scientists in the United States use the term "second generation", they usually refer to people with one foreign-born parent. Likewise, Statistics Canada defines second generation persons as those individuals who were born in Canada and had at least one parent born outside Canada. Some researchers have begun to question whether those with one native-born parent and those with no native-born parents should be lumped together, with evidence suggesting that there are significant differences in identities and various outcomes between the two groups. For instance, patterns of ethnic identification with the majority ethnic group and the heritage ethnic group differ between the 1.0, 2.0, and 2.5 generations, such that there is greater polarization between the two identities in the 1.0 generation (i.e., identifying as Canadian implies dis-identifying as a member of the heritage ethnic community and vice versa), a lack of a relation between the two identities in the 2.0 generation, and a positive association between the two identities for the 2.5 generation (i.e., implying that the two identities are compatible and possibly hybridized).

== Factors leading to immigrant generations' accomplishments ==
Most immigrant youth tend to have higher academic achievement at all levels, at times even having greater levels of post-secondary education than their parents and grandparents. To explain that phenomenon, called the immigrant paradox, there are several factors that are noticeable:

1. Immigrant children usually have more in the way of family obligation than children not born of immigrants and so they are more likely to feel pressure to study seriously at school and gain the ability to provide for their relatives. That can also be explained by a stronger emphasis on higher education from their immigrant parents, who may invest in tutoring and private schooling to increase the human capital of their children.
2. Optimism, the idea that if they put in the work, they will achieve social mobility in the host nation, is also an important factor that motivates immigrant generations to work hard and succeed.
3. Most immigrant generations learn their mother tongue alongside the local national language(s) of their host country. As bilinguals, they have "advantages on all tasks especially involving conflicting attention".

Many of those factors are reinforced and supported by the parents of immigrant youth who may have immigrated in the first place only to provide their children with a brighter future.

== See also ==
- Issei, Nisei, Sansei, Yonsei, and Gosei, Japanese terminology for immigrant generations, coined from the Japanese words ichi, ni, san, yon, go for 1, 2, 3, 4, 5
- Inequality within immigrant families in the United States
- Second-generation immigrants in the United States
- Cultural assimilation
- Dekasegi
