= Dekasegi =

Japanese Brazilians having migrated to Japan

Dekasegi (Portuguese: decassegui, decasségui, [dekaseˈɡi], [dekɐˈsɛɡi]) is a term that is used in Latin America to refer to people, primarily Japanese Brazilians and Japanese Peruvians, who have migrated to Japan, having taken advantage of Japanese citizenship or nisei visa and immigration laws to work short-term in Japan.

The original Japanese word dekasegi (出稼ぎ) roughly translates as "working away from home". In the 1960s and 1970s it was applied to internal short-term or seasonal economic migrants, but it has come to be applied also to international workers. This can cause irritation to those of Japanese descent who were born abroad, but have come to regard Japan as their permanent home and therefore object to being regarded by Japanese (in Japan) as gaijin or foreigners.

There are approximately 200,000 such people in Japan from Brazil alone.

== Language ==
Some Brazilians are bilingual in Japanese and Portuguese, but many are monolingual in Portuguese alone when they first come to Japan and face additional challenges due to this language barrier. Many code-switch, using Japanese words when speaking Portuguese.

== See also ==
- Ethnic groups of Japan
- Issei, Nisei, Sansei, Yonsei, and Gosei
- Japanese people
- Language minority students in Japanese classrooms
- Migrant worker
