= Flora Ahn =

American children's-book author and illustrator

- Occupations: Author illustrator
- Known for: Pug Pals children's book series
- Notable work: Two's a Crowd, Yay for Vacay, A Spoonful of Time, The Golden Orchard
- Website: www.bahhumpug.com

Flora Ahn is an American author and illustrator of children's books.

== Career ==
Ahn was raised in California. She is a first-generation American of Korean descent. She lives in Virginia and works as an attorney in Washington, D.C.

Ahn has published two books in the Pug Pals series: Two's a Crowd (2017) and Yay for Vacay (2019).

Two's a Crowd was reviewed by Publishers Weekly as "a breezy and entertaining story of sibling rivalry turned revelry". Kirkus Reviews called it "a fun pet romp for new readers of chapter books" School Library Journal called it "a charming beginning chapter book with many illustrations that will appeal to pug-loving young readers".

Yay for Vacay was reviewed by The Horn Book, which called it a "cozy (if slight) mystery".

Ahn's Audible Original The Golden Orchard was narrated by Kathleen Choe and released in 2020.

A Spoonful of Time, a standalone fantasy novel for children, was released in 2023. The novel includes references to Korean culture and includes recipes. Publishers Weekly called it an "affectionately wrought contemporary novel". Kirkus Reviews criticized the writing for being potentially confusing to young readers. It was also reviewed by Booklist, which referred to it as "a warm and satisfying intergenerational story".

== Works ==
- The Golden Orchard. Audible Audio. 2020.
- A Spoonful of Time. Quirk Books. 2023. ISBN 9781683693185.

=== Pug Pals series ===
- Two's a Crowd. Scholastic. 2017. ISBN 9781338118452.
- Yay for Vacay. Scholastic. 2019. ISBN 9781338118476.
