= Best Offer Wins =

2025 novel by Marisa Kashino

- Author: Marisa Kashino
- Cover artist: Chloé Dorgan
- Genre: Thriller
- Set in: Washington, DC
- Publisher: Celadon Books
- Publication date: 11/25/2025
- Pages: 288
- ISBN: 9781250400543

Best Offer Wins is Marisa Kashino's debut thriller novel about a woman who becomes obsessed with being able to purchase her dream house.

== Inspiration ==
Marisa Kashino said she was inspired to write Best Offer Wins after working as a news reporter covering real estate during the COVID-19 pandemic. She heard many anecdotal accounts of properties receiving over 50 offers and going for thousands over the list price. Kashino herself bought a home in Cabin John, Maryland in 2021. Both of these experiences led her to consider writing a novel set in the competitive world of house hunting.

== Development ==
Kashino signed up for a class to learn how to write fiction, working on her manuscript on the weekends. When comparing novel writing with her previous job at The Washington Post, Kashino said she misses having a team to help with aspects like editing and publicity. She chose to set the book in the suburbs of Washington, D.C. to reflect the competitive nature of life even outside of the White House. In an interview with Washingtonian magazine, Kashino said, "I did intend for the book to read in part like a love letter to the city."

=== Margo ===
When developing the character of Margo, Kashino hoped to strike a balance between making her detestable and loveable. In order to achieve a nuanced portrayal, Kashino fleshed out her character's backstory, giving her a difficult childhood, as well as a strong sense of humor. Margo's poor upbringing led to imposter syndrome after moving to Washington, D.C., according to Kashino.

Kashino also decided to make Margo Japanese-American, an ethnicity she shares with the character. Kashino said making Margo's demographics somewhat similar to her own allowed her to reduce research time. Additionally, Kashino made sure that the book did not center on Margo's Asian identity, but rather was only a part of who she is. While writing the novel, Kashino thought of Margo as yonsei (fourth generation Japanese-American). The conflict between Margo and Ian (her white husband) is further exacerbated by their cultural differences.

=== Cover art ===
Chloé Dorgan designed the cover art for Best Offer Wins. She chose bright colors, like pink and violet, to draw the reader's eye to the cover. The house shapes, stacked inside one another like Russian dolls, reflect the narrator's worsening obsession with her dream home.

== Synopsis ==
The story follows 37-year-old Margo Miyake, who lives in a small one bedroom apartment with her husband, Ian. The two have been wanting to move into a larger home for a while, but due to the difficult housing market, they have been unable to. The couple also want children, but have been struggling with infertility. Margo receives a tip from her real estate agent about a house that will be going on market soon, causing her to visit the house in person to scope it out.

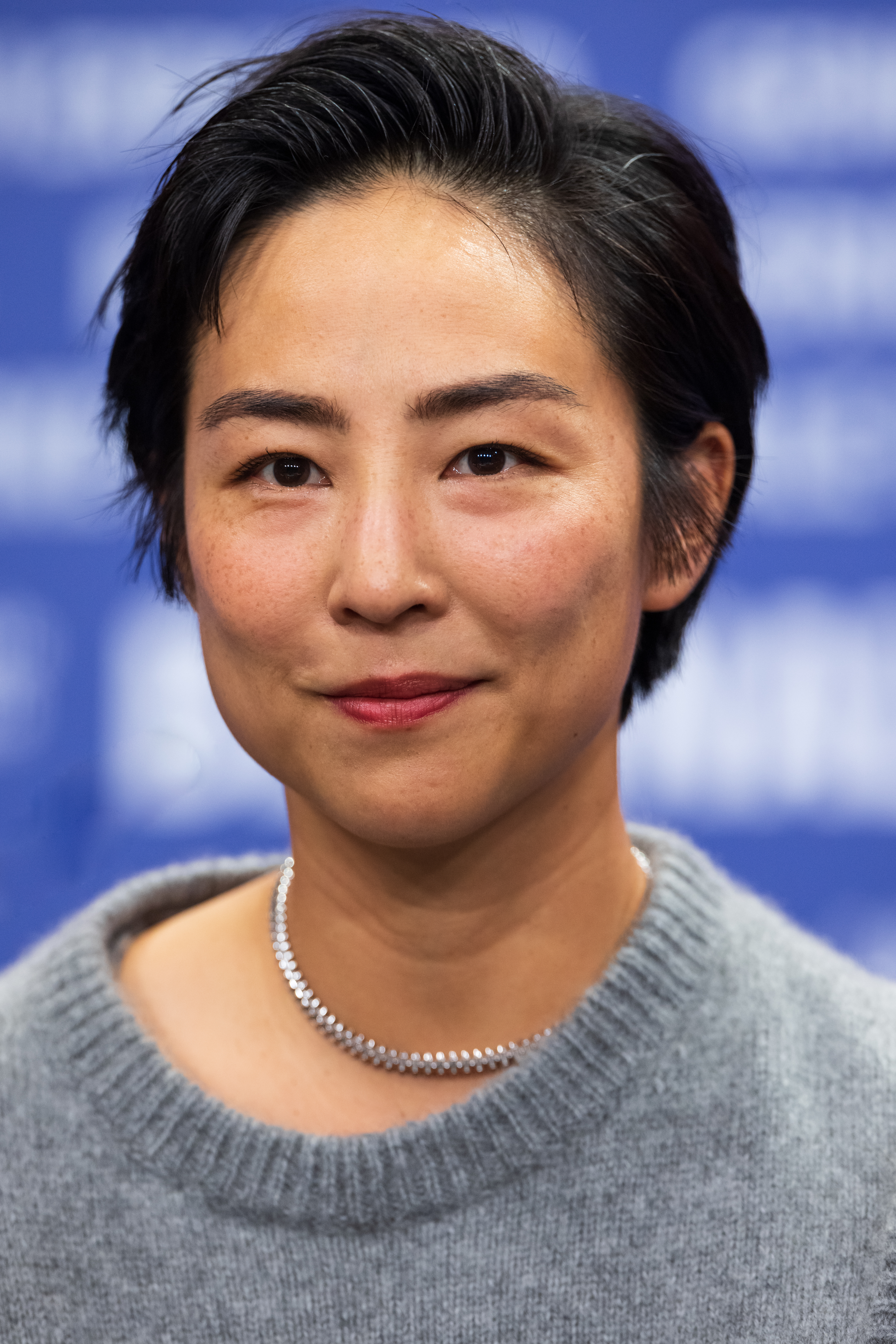
Greta Lee is set to play Margo in the television adaptation.

After deciding the house is perfect, Margo signs up for a yoga class at a studio she knows the homeowners attend. There, she fakes the desire to adopt a child in order to get closer to Jack, whom she learns has an adopted daughter, Penny, with his husband Curt. Jack invites Margo and her husband to dinner sometime in their home. Although reluctant after learning of her stalking, Ian attends with Margo. The dinner starts out successful, but ultimately ends awkwardly after Margo makes them an offer on their home and Ian accidentally reveals that Margo knew about their house beforehand.

Margo decides she must resort to new tactics to secure the home. She begins looking for blackmail on Curt, a Georgetown tenured professor who has published a book on economics. She notices the book has an anonymous review claiming that Curt is untrustworthy. Margo traces the source to one of Curt's ex-students, Dottie, whom she tracks down in West Virginia. Dottie reveals that she dropped out of Georgetown after Curt plagiarized her essay as the first chapter of his book.

Upon returning home, Margo finds a flip phone that Ian has been using to covertly cheat with a 23-year-old intern named Alex. Using the plagiarism as blackmail, Margo gets Curt to agree to convince Jack to sell them the house. In order to get Ian to agree to put an offer forward, Margo brings up his affair. Their offer, however, is in competition with others, and it seems unlikely Curt will cave after realizing Margo doesn't have proof of the plagiarized essay.

Margo decides to take matters into her own hands, ultimately murdering Alex and pinning the murder on her next-door neighbor, Natalie. She leaves Alex's body in a suitcase in the house's basement, hoping that the belief that a murder took place on the property will scare off potential buyers. Ian finds out what Margo has done and is devastated, but ultimately stays with her after finding out she is pregnant. Margo and Ian win the house.

== Reception ==
Kirkus Reviews has called the novel "deliciously dark and twistedly funny." The character of Margo was compared to Glenn Close in Fatal Attraction, who stops at nothing for revenge. In a review published by Times Leader, Best Offer Wins is described as an easy read that improves as it goes on.

== Television adaption ==
A television adaptation of Best Offer Wins was announced from Hulu. Greta Lee is set to be both an executive producer and Margo. Suzanne Heathcote is the showrunner.
