= Gosei (Japanese diaspora) =

Japanese diasporic term

Gosei (五世, transl. 'fifth generation') is a Japanese diasporic term used in countries, particularly in North America and South America, to specify the great-great-grandchildren of Japanese immigrants (Issei). The children of Issei are Nisei (the second generation). Sansei are the third generation, and their offspring are Yonsei. The children of at least one Yonsei parent are called Gosei.

The character and uniqueness of the Gosei are recognized in its social history. The Gosei are the subject of ongoing academic research in the United States and Japan.

== History ==
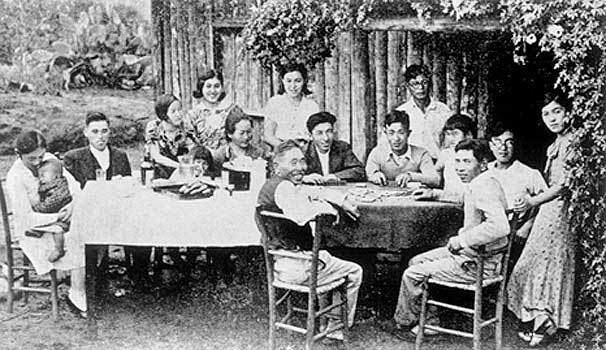
The great-great-grandchildren of these Japanese-American (Nipon-Americans) immigrants would be called Gosei.

The earliest organized group of Japanese emigrants settled in Mexico in 1897. Today, the four largest populations of Japanese and descendants of Japanese immigrants live in the United States, Canada, Brazil and Peru. Gosei is a term used in these geographic areas outside Japan. Gosei characterizes the child of at least one Yonsei (fourth generation) parent. Differences among these national Gosei developed because of the varying historical processes through which their Japanese emigrant forebears became Nikkei.

=== Gosei in the US ===
The lives of Japanese-Americans of earlier generations contrast with the Gosei generation and beyond, who often lack a single surviving grandparent with firsthand memory of the culture. According to a 2011 columnist in The Rafu Shimpo of Los Angeles, "Younger Japanese Americans are more culturally American than Japanese" and "other than some vestigial cultural affiliations, a Yonsei or Gosei is simply another American."

American descendants of Wakamatsu colonist Masumizu Kuninosuke are in the seventh (Nanasei) generation through his marriage to a mixed African-Native American woman in 1877, some who only discovered the ancestry of their 1/64th ancestor through a DNA test.

=== Gosei in Canada ===
Japanese-Canadian Gosei are entirely acculturated, as is typical for any ethnic group.

=== Gosei in Peru ===
Japanese-Peruvian (Nipo-peruano) Gosei made up less than 1.0% of the Nikkei population in 2000. They are represented by the Asociación Peruano Japonesa.

=== Gosei in Brazil ===
Japanese-Brazilians (Nipo-brasileiro) make up the largest Japanese population in South America (and indeed anywhere outside of Japan), numbering an estimated less than 242,543 (including those of mixed-race or mixed-ethnicity), more than the 1.8 million in the United States. The Gosei are a small part of the ethnic minority in that South American nation in the last decades of the 20th century. In 1990, 0.8% of the Nipo-Brasileiros community were Gosei.

== Cultural profile ==
=== Generations ===
The term Nikkei (日系) encompasses all of the world's Japanese immigrants across generations. In North America, the Gosei are among the heirs of the "activist generation" known as the Sansei.

Generation	Cohort description
Issei (一世)	The generation of people born in Japan who later immigrated to another country.
Nisei (二世)	The generation of people born in any country outside Japan to at least one Issei parent.
Sansei (三世)	The generation of people born to at least one Nisei parent.
Yonsei (四世)	The generation of people born to at least one Sansei parent.
Gosei (五世)	The generation of people born to at least one Yonsei parent.
