= Yonsei (Japanese diaspora) =

Japanese diasporic term

Yonsei (四世, "fourth generation") is a Japanese diasporic term used in countries, particularly in North America and in Latin America, to specify the great-grandchildren of Japanese immigrants (Issei). The children of Issei are Nisei (the second generation). Sansei are the third generation, and their offspring are Yonsei. For the majority of Yonsei in the Western Hemisphere, their Issei ancestors emigrated from Japan between the 1880s and 1924.

The character and uniqueness of the Yonsei is recognized in its social history. The Yonsei are the subject of ongoing academic research in the United States and Japan.

== History ==
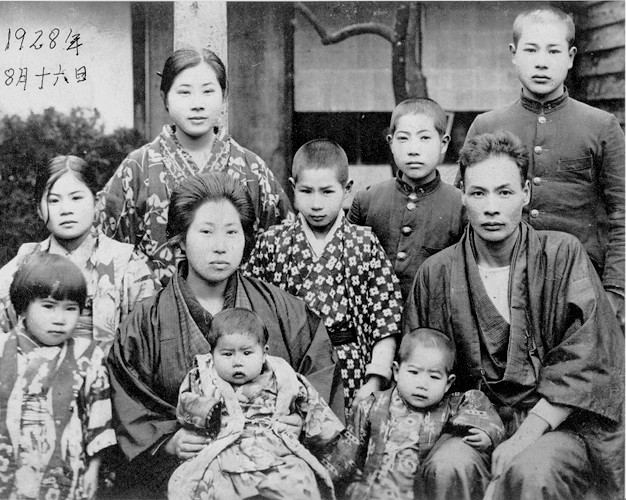
The great-grandchildren of these Japanese-Brazilian (Nipo-brasileiros) immigrants would be called Yonsei.

The earliest organized group of Japanese emigrants settled in Mexico in 1897. Today, the four largest populations of Japanese and descendants of Japanese immigrants live in Brazil, the United States, Canada and Peru. The Pan American Nikkei Association (PANA) includes Argentina, Bolivia, Brazil, Chile, Colombia, Mexico, Paraguay, Peru, Uruguay, the United States and Canada.

Yonsei is a term used in geographic areas outside Japan to specify the child of at least one Sansei (third generation) parent, who is the child of at least one Nisei (second generation), who is the child of at least one Issei parent. An Issei is a Japanese person who emigrated from Japan. Typically, if a person is Yonsei, more than one of his or her great-grandparents was born in Japan.

=== Brazilian Yonsei ===
Brazil is home to the largest Japanese population outside Japan, numbering an estimate of more than 1.5 million (including those of mixed-race or mixed-ethnicity). The Yonsei Japanese Brazilians are a statistically significant component of that ethnic minority in that South American nation, comprising 12.95% of the Japanese Brazilian population in 1987.

=== American Yonsei ===
There are about 1.2 million people with Japanese ancestors in the United States.

The term Yonsei Japanese American refers generally to Yonsei citizens of the United States, but the term's usage is flexible—describing both emigrant and immigrant experiences. Most of the interned Japanese-Peruvian Nisei who were deported from Peru during World War II became naturalized American citizens; but they considered their naturalized children as Sansei, meaning three generations away from the emigrants who had sailed to South America at the turn of the century. From this perspective, the sons and daughters of these formerly stateless refugees would be Yonsei, even as offspring of parents who would be otherwise categorized as Issei or "first generation" immigrants would also be called Nisei.

While the Japanese Americans were the largest ethnic group in Hawai'i for more than sixty years (1900–1960), their numbers have decreased since then. The Hawaiian Yonsei don't have to be actively involved in the creation of their group ethnic identity and they tend to dichotomize their American and Japanese heritage. As of 2008, the U.S. yonsei generation had been the subject of relatively few academic studies. Notable among the literature to date on yonsei is Carrie Takahata's 2002 poem "Making Yonsei", in which she compares and contrasts the yonsei generation with previous Hawaiian Japanese generations.

The yonsei differ from previous generations of Japanese-Americans in that World War II and the internment camps which overshadowed the lives of previous generations are concepts unrelated to their daily existence. Due to a lack of obvious struggles or difficulties faced by previous generations of Japanese-Americans, the yonsei are sometimes called the "spoiled generation". The yonsei generation in Hawai'i can be compared to white Americans in the continental U.S. The yonsei have an equal, if not higher, educational, economic and political status as their continental white counterparts, and also have a low immigration rate, as Japanese immigration has declined since 1965. Also, intermarriage with non-Japanese became common in the Japanese American community in the 1960s. Intermarriage among Japanese Americans was at approximately 50% by the 1970s, and at 70% in the 1990s. This cultural distance from the original homeland results in a "symbolic" expression of ethnicity seen in both the continental white and the Hawaiian yonsei groups. Outside of the continental white population, the yonsei of Hawai'i are one of the few U.S. ethnic groups that express their ethnicity in a "symbolic" way.

While members of the sansei and yonsei generation may visit Japan, they tend to see this activity only as tourism. Japanese cultural structure is generally not present among the yonsei generation. According to a 2006 study of yonsei women in Hawai'i, this generation of Japanese-Americans tends to assert their ethnicity in such "symbolic" ways as the celebration of holidays and ceremonies associated with Japan, eating ethnic foods, and the use of Japanese middle-names. The study noted that the yonsei generation considered its ethnicity to be less important than did previous generations of Japanese-Americans. Cheryl Lynn Sullivan, an ethnic research who specializes in the Japanese-American community of California, wrote, "It is common in the Japanese American community not to consider yonsei Japanese American -- they are 'just plain Americans.' This is especially true of children who are the offspring of Japanese American-Euro-American marriages." Others celebrate their ancestry in cultural exchanges based around youth and sports events, e.g. Yonsei Basketball Association.

According to a 2011 columnist in The Rafu Shimpo of Los Angeles, "Younger Japanese Americans are more culturally American than Japanese" and "other than some vestigial cultural affiliations, a Yonsei or Gosei is simply another American."

Different organizations were created within the Japanese American community in order for the children of these Japanese American families to have a place where they could partake in different extracurricular activities, such as basketball, golf, baseball, etc. One such organization was the Yonsei Basketball Association, which was created in 1993 by Frank Kiyomura. Its mission statement is, "Our program was founded with a goal of providing a cultural exchange program for Fourth Generation Japanese-American youth from Southern California. We want to provide an opportunity for all participants to experience their heritage and cultural roots. In addition, we hope to provide a goodwill exchange of ideas and cultures by living with local Japanese families." Every year they give out scholarships to selected children from the Japanese American community and assemble both a boys' and girls' team together to send and play in a tournament in Japan.

=== Canadian Yonsei ===
Within Japanese-Canadian communities across Canada, distinct generational subgroups developed, each with different sociocultural referents, generational identity, and wartime experiences.

=== Peruvian Yonsei ===
Among the approximately 80,000 Peruvians of Japanese descent, the Yonsei Japanese Peruvians are an expanding element.

== Cultural profile ==
=== Generations ===
The term Nikkei (日系) encompasses all of the world's Japanese immigrants across generations. The collective memory of the Issei and older Nisei was an image of Meiji Japan from 1870 through 1911, which contrasted sharply with the Japan that newer immigrants had more recently left. These differing attitudes, social values and associations with Japan were often incompatible with each other. In this context, the significant differences in life experiences and opportunities has done little to mitigate the gaps which separated generational perspectives amongst their children and grandchildren.

Generation	Cohort description
Issei (一世)	The generation of people born in Japan who later migrated to another country.
Nisei (二世)	The generation of people born in North America, Latin America, Australia, Hawaii, or any country outside Japan either to at least one Issei or one non-immigrant Japanese parent.
Sansei (三世)	The generation of people born to at least one Nisei parent.
Yonsei (四世)	The generation of people born to at least one Sansei parent.
Gosei (五世)	The generation of people born to at least one Yonsei parent.

The Yonsei, their parents, their grandparents, and their children are changing the way they look at themselves and their pattern of accommodation to the non-Japanese majority.

There are currently just over one hundred thousand British Japanese, mostly in London; but unlike other Nikkei communities elsewhere in the world, these Britons do not conventionally parse their communities in generational terms as Issei, Nisei, or Sansei. In Britain, there are often only Issei and Nisei.

== Notable yonsei ==
- Cary Joji Fukunaga
- Warren Furutani
- Colleen Hanabusa
- Gina Hiraizumi
- Garrett Hongo
- David Horvitz
- Grant Imahara
- Brittany Ishibashi
- Travis Ishikawa
- Paul Kariya
- Guy Kawasaki
- Robert Kiyosaki
- Pedro Kumamoto
- Brandon League
- Ally Maki
- Ross Mihara
- Alan Muraoka
- Jolene Purdy
- Lenn Sakata
- Garret T. Sato
- Devin Setoguchi
- Samantha Sencer-Mura
- Taylor Takahashi
- Jill Tokuda
- Don Wakamatsu
- Rachael Yamagata
- Kristi Yamaguchi
