= Sansei =

Grandchildren of Japanese-born emigrants

Sansei (三世, "third generation") is a Japanese and North American English term used in parts of the world (mainly in South America and North America) to refer to the children of children born to ethnically Japanese emigrants (Issei) in a new country of residence, outside of Japan. The nisei are considered the second generation, while grandchildren of the Japanese-born emigrants are called Sansei. The fourth generation is referred to as yonsei. The children of at least one nisei parent are called Sansei; they are usually the first generation of whom a high percentage are mixed-race, given that their parents were (usually), themselves, born and raised in America.

The character and uniqueness of the sansei is recognized in its social history.

== By country ==
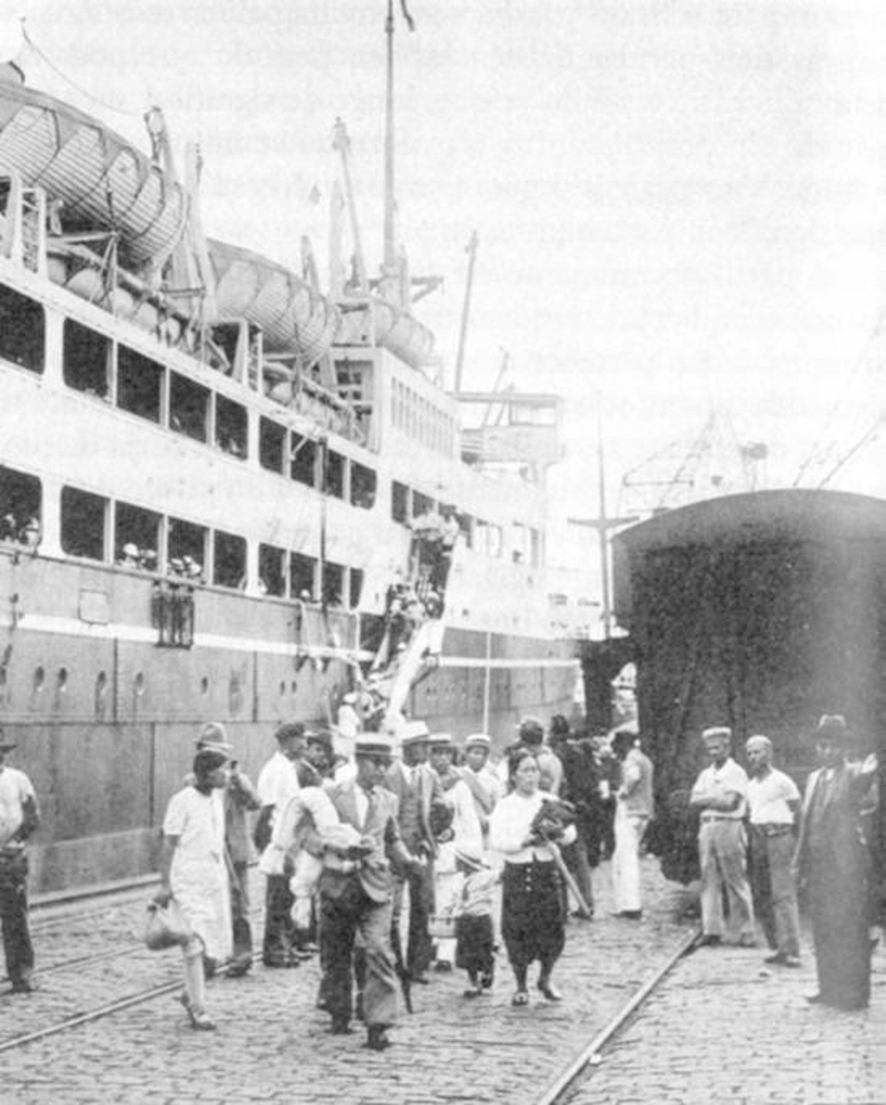
The grandchildren of these Japanese-Brazilian (Nipo-brasileiros) immigrants are called Sansei.

Although the earliest organized group of Japanese emigrants settled in Mexico in 1897, the four largest populations of Japanese and their descendants are in Brazil, the United States, Canada, and Peru.

=== Brazilian Sansei ===
Brazil is home to the largest Japanese population outside of Japan, with an estimate of more than 1.5 million people (including those of mixed-race or mixed-ethnicity), more than that of the 1.2 million in the United States. The Sansei Japanese of Brazil are an important ethnic minority in the South American nation.

=== American Sansei ===
Most American Sansei were born during the Baby Boom after the end of World War II; older Sansei, who were living in the western United States during the war, were forcibly incarcerated with their parents (Nisei) and grandparents (Issei) after Executive Order 9066 was promulgated to exclude everyone of Japanese descent from the West Coast and from Southern Arizona. The Sansei were forceful activists in the redress movement of the 1980s, which resulted in an official apology to the internees. In some senses, the Sansei seem to feel they are caught in a dilemma between their "quiet" Nisei parents and their other identity model of "verbal" and outspoken Americans.

In the United States, an iconic Sansei is General Eric Shinseki (born November 28, 1942, 34th Chief of Staff of the United States Army (1999–2003) and former United States Secretary of Veterans Affairs. He is the first Asian American in U.S. history to be a four-star general, and the first to lead one of the four U.S. military services.

=== Canadian Sansei ===
Within Japanese-Canadian communities across Canada, three distinct subgroups developed, each with different sociocultural referents, generational identities, and wartime experiences.

=== Peruvian Sansei ===
Among the approximately 80,000 Peruvians of Japanese descent, the Sansei Japanese Peruvians comprise the largest number. Former Peruvian President Alberto Fujimori, who was in office from 28 July 1990 until 22 November 2000, was the nisei son of Issei emigrants from Kumamoto City, Kumamoto Prefecture, Japan.

== Cultural profile ==
=== Generations ===
Japanese-Americans and Japanese-Canadians have special names for each of their generations in North America. These are formed by combining one of the Japanese numbers corresponding to the generation with the Japanese word for generation (sei 世). The Japanese-American and Japanese-Canadian communities have themselves distinguished their members with terms like Issei, Nisei and Sansei which describe the first, second and third generation of immigrants. The fourth generation is called Yonsei (四世) and the fifth is called Gosei (五世). The Issei, Nisei and Sansei generations reflect distinctly different attitudes to authority, gender, non-Japanese involvement, religious belief and practice and other matters. The age when individuals faced the wartime evacuation and internment is the single, most significant factor which explains these variations in their experiences, attitudes and behaviour patterns.

The term Nikkei (日系) encompasses all of the world's Japanese immigrants across generations. The collective memory of the Issei and older Nisei was an image of Meiji Japan from 1870 through 1911, which contrasted sharply with the Japan that newer immigrants had more recently left. These differing attitudes, social values and associations with Japan were often incompatible with each other. In this context, the significant differences in post-war experiences and opportunities did nothing to mitigate the gaps which separated generational perspectives.

| Generation | Cohort description |
|---|---|
| Issei (一世) | The generation of people born in Japan who later immigrated to another country. |
| Nisei (二世) | The generation of people born outside Japan to at least one Issei parent. |
| Sansei (三世) | The generation of people born to at least one Nisei parent. |
| Yonsei (四世) | The generation of people born to at least one Sansei parent. |
| Gosei (五世) | The generation of people born to at least one Yonsei parent. |

In North America since the redress victory in 1988, a significant evolutionary change has occurred. The Sansei, their parents, their grandparents, and their children are changing the way they look at themselves and their pattern of accommodation to the non-Japanese majority.

There are currently just over one hundred thousand British Japanese, mostly in London; but unlike other Nikkei communities elsewhere in the world, these Britons do not conventionally parse their communities in generational terms as Issei, Nisei or Sansei.

==== Sansei ====
The third generation of immigrants, born in the United States or Canada to parents born in the United States or Canada, is called Sansei (三世). Children born to the Nisei were generally born after 1945. They speak English as their first language and are completely acculturized in the contexts of Canadian or American society. They tend to identify with Canadian or American values, norms and expectations. Few speak Japanese and most tend to express their identity as Canadian or American rather than Japanese. Among the Sansei there is an overwhelming percentage of marriages to persons of non-Japanese ancestry.

==== Aging ====
The kanreki (還暦), a traditional, pre-modern Japanese rite of passage to old age at 60, was sometimes celebrated by the Issei and is now being celebrated by increasing numbers of Nisei and a few Sansei. Rituals are enactments of shared meanings, norms, and values and this Japanese rite of passage highlights a collective response among the Nisei to the conventional dilemmas of growing older.

== History ==
=== Internment and redress ===
Some responded to internment with lawsuits and political action; and for others, poetry became an unplanned consequence:

With new hope.
We build new lives.
Why complain when it rains?
This is what it means to be free.
Lawson Fusao Inada, Japanese American Historical Plaza, Portland, Oregon.

== Politics ==
The sansei became known as the "activist generation" because of their large hand in the redress movement and individuals that have become a part of the American mainstream political landscape.

== Notable individuals ==
The numbers of sansei who have earned some degree of public recognition has continued to increase over time; but the quiet lives of those whose names are known only to family and friends are no less important in understanding the broader narrative of the Nikkei. Although the names highlighted here are over-represented by sansei from North America, the Latin American member countries of the Pan American Nikkei Association (PANA) include Argentina, Bolivia, Brazil, Chile, Colombia, Mexico, Paraguay, Peru, Uruguay, in addition to the English-speaking United States and Canada.

- Francis Fukuyama
- Robert S. Hamada
- Ryan Higa
- Kyle Higashioka
- Mike Honda
- Kaisei Ichiro
- Lawson Fusao Inada
- Michio Kaku
- Soji Kashiwagi
- Ken Kashiwahara
- Janice Kawaye
- Kyle Larson
- Doris Matsui
- Robert Matsui
- Dale Minami
- Patsy Mink
- Kent Nagano
- Suzy Nakamura
- Desmond Nakano
- Lane Nishikawa
- Linda Nishio
- Bev Oda
- Sophie Oda
- Steven Okazaki
- Yuji Okumoto
- Ellison Onizuka
- Pete Rouse
- Lenn Sakata
- Roger Shimomura
- Mike Shinoda
- Eric Shinseki
- David Suzuki
- Ronald Takaki
- Mark Takano
- Dan Tani
- Chris Tashima
- David Tsubouchi
- Gedde Watanabe
- Kristi Yamaguchi
- Jan Yanehiro

== See also ==
- Asian American
- Asian Canadian
- Hyphenated American
- Japanese American Citizens League
- Japanese American National Library
- Japanese American Internment Museum
- Japanese American National Museum
- Japanese Canadian
- Japanese Brazilian
- Japanese community in the United Kingdom
- Japanese people
- List of Japanese Americans
- Model minority
- Nisei Baseball Research Project
- Pacific Movement of the Eastern World
- Japanese American internment
- Gila River War Relocation Center
- Granada War Relocation Center
- Heart Mountain War Relocation Center
- Jerome War Relocation Center
- Manzanar National Historic Site
- Minidoka National Historic Site
- Poston War Relocation Center
- Rohwer War Relocation Center
- Topaz War Relocation Center
- Tule Lake War Relocation Center
- 100th Infantry Battalion (United States)
- 442nd Infantry Regiment (United States)
- Go For Broke Monument
