= Japanese diaspora =

Japanese emigrants and descendants residing in foreign countries outside of Japan

日系人 Nikkeijin

Total population
- Estimated at 5 million (2023)

Regions with significant populations
- Brazil: 2,700,000 (2025)
- United States: 1,550,875 (2020)
- Peru: 203,130 (2023)
- Canada: 129,425 (2021)
- Philippines: 120,000
- Australia: 104,141 (2024)^{note}
- China: 97,538 (2024)^{note}
- Mexico: 88,985 (2024)
- Argentina: 75,528 (2024)
- Thailand: 70,421 (2024)^{note}
- South Korea: 70,375 (2025)^{note}
- United Kingdom: 64,066 (2024)^{note}
- Germany: 43,513 (2024)^{note}
- France: 37,056 (2024)^{note}
- Singapore: 32,565 (2024)^{note}
- Taiwan: 21,696 (2024)^{note}
- New Zealand: 20,318 (2024)^{note}
- Malaysia: 20,025 (2024)^{note}
- Micronesia: 20,000 (2018)
Other countries (fewer than 20,000)
Vietnam	17,410 (2024)^{note}
Indonesia	14,934 (2024)^{note}
Switzerland	12,085 (2024)^{note}
Netherlands	10,656 (2024)^{note}

Related ethnic groups
- Ryukyuan diaspora
- Note: For this country, only the number of residents with Japanese nationality is shown, since the number of naturalized Japanese people and their descendants is unknown.

The Japanese diaspora and its individual members, known as Nikkei (Japanese: 日系, IPA: [ɲikkeː]) or as Nikkeijin (Japanese: 日系人, IPA: [ɲikkeꜜːʑiɴ]), comprise the Japanese emigrants from Japan (and their descendants) residing in a country outside Japan. Emigration from Japan was recorded as early as the 15th century to the Philippines, but did not become a mass phenomenon until the Meiji period (1868–1912), when Japanese emigrated to the Philippines and to the Americas. There was significant emigration to the territories of the Empire of Japan during the period of Japanese colonial expansion (1875–1945); however, most of these emigrants repatriated to Japan after the 1945 surrender of Japan ended World War II in Asia.

According to the Japanese Ministry of Foreign Affairs, about 5 million Nikkei live in their adopted countries. The largest of these foreign communities are in Brazil, the United States, the United Kingdom, the Philippines, China, Canada, and Peru. Descendants of emigrants from the Meiji period still maintain recognizable communities in those countries, forming separate ethnic groups from Japanese people in Japan. The largest of these foreign communities are in the Brazilian states of São Paulo and Paraná. There are also significant cohesive Japanese communities in the Philippines, Peru and in the American state of Hawaii. Nevertheless, most emigrant Japanese are largely assimilated outside of Japan.

As of 2025, the Ministry of Foreign Affairs reported the five countries with the highest number of Japanese expatriates as the United States (416,380), Australia (105,566), China (92,928), Canada (75,316), Thailand (72,113), and United Kingdom (62,270).

== Terminology ==
The term Nikkei, from the Japanese word nikkei (日系; lit. "of Japanese lineage"), is often used to refer to Japanese people who emigrated from Japan and their descendants. These groups were historically differentiated by the terms issei (first-generation Nikkei), nisei (second-generation Nikkei), sansei (third-generation Nikkei), yonsei (fourth-generation Nikkei), and gosei (fifth-generation Nikkei). In this context emigration refers to permanent settlers, excluding transient Japanese abroad, although the term may not strictly relate to citizenship status. The Japanese government defines Nikkei people as foreign citizens with the ability to provide proof of Japanese lineage within three generations. On the other hand, in the United States and some other places where Nikkei people have developed their own communities and identities, first-generation Japanese immigrants with Japanese citizenship tend to be included if they are involved in the local community.

The Japanese American National Museum, based upon a collaborative project that involved more than 100 scholars from 10 countries, has defined Nikkei as follows:

We are talking about Nikkei people - Japanese emigrants and their descendants who have created communities throughout the world. The term Nikkei has multiple and diverse meanings depending on situations, places, and environments. Nikkei also include people of mixed racial descent who identify themselves as Nikkei. Native Japanese also use the term Nikkei for the emigrants and their descendants who return to Japan. Many of these Nikkei live in close communities and retain identities separate from the native Japanese.

The Japanese Ministry of Foreign Affairs' definition of nikkeijin (Nikkei people) has changed over time. The 1969 edition of the Survey of Japanese Nationals Overseas defined nikkeijin as those not possessing Japanese nationality who might be regarded as ethnically Japanese, including first-generation naturalized immigrants and second- and third-generation descendants. However, the 1982 edition of the survey stated that the scope of the term could not be clearly delineated. The 2002 edition of the survey defined nikkeijin as consisting of both Japanese nationals residing overseas permanently and those not possessing Japanese nationality who might be regarded as ethnically Japanese.

== Early history ==
Japanese emigration to the rest of Asia was noted as early as the 15th century to the Philippines; early Japanese settlements included those in Lingayen Gulf, Manila, the coasts of Ilocos and in the Visayas when the Philippines was under the influence of Srivijaya and Majapahit Empire. In 2009, Japanese and Filipino archaeologists, from the Sumitomo Foundation-funded Boljoon Archaeological Project conducted by the University of San Carlos with the National Museum of the Philippines, discovered ancient Japanese pottery that is believed to have been in existence since the early 1700s. The ancient Japanese pottery that was discovered there has proven that there was trading activity between Japan and Cebu Island Philippines going back to the 16th century. In the 16th century the Japanese settlement was established in Ayutthaya, Thailand and in early 17th century Japanese settlers were first recorded to stay in Dutch East Indies (now Indonesia). A larger wave came in the 17th century, when red seal ships traded in Southeast Asia and Japanese Catholics fled from the religious persecution imposed by the shōguns and settled in the Philippines, among other destinations. Many of them also intermarried with the local Filipina women (including those of pure or mixed Chinese and Spanish descent), thus forming the new Japanese-Mestizo community. In the 16th and 17th centuries, thousands of traders from Japan also migrated to the Philippines and assimilated into the local population. In the 15th century AD, shimamono tea-jars were bought by the shōguns to Uji in Kyoto from the Philippines by merchants such as Luzon Sukezaemon which was used in the Japanese tea ceremony. In the latter half of the 16th century the Portuguese Empire purchased and sold on Japanese slaves.

From the 15th through the early 17th century, Japanese seafarers traveled to China and Southeast Asia countries, in some cases establishing early Japantowns. This activity ended in the 1640s, when the Tokugawa shogunate imposed maritime restrictions which forbade Japanese from leaving the country and from returning if they were already abroad. This policy would not be lifted for over two hundred years. Travel restrictions were eased once Japan opened diplomatic relations with Western nations. In 1867, the bakufu began issuing travel documents for overseas travel and emigration.

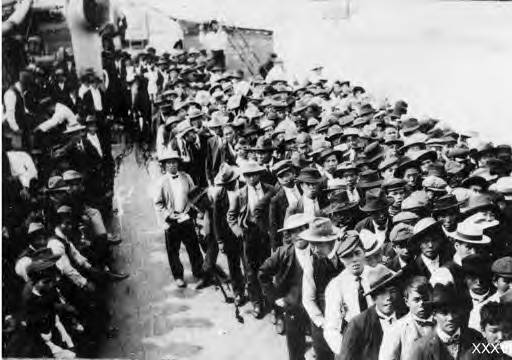
View of passengers arriving in Vancouver aboard the steamship Kumeric, 1907

Many bakufu era travellers were the children of affluent and influential families, such as the Satsuma 15 student Nagasawa Kanaye, who initially travelled to the UK in 1865, then made his way to the US, and the Aizu retainers who founded the Wakamatsu Tea and Silk Farm Colony in California in 1869. American descendants of Wakamatsu colonist Masumizu Kuninosuke are now in the seventh generation through his marriage to an African/Native American woman in 1877.

Before 1885, few Japanese people emigrated from Japan, in part because the Meiji government was reluctant to allow emigration, both because it lacked the political power to adequately protect Japanese emigrants and because it believed that the presence of Japanese as unskilled laborers in foreign countries would hamper its ability to revise the unequal treaties. A notable exception to this trend was a group of 153 contract laborers who immigrated—without official passports—to Hawaii and Guam in 1868. A portion of this group stayed on after the expiration of the initial labor contract, forming the nucleus of the Nikkei community in Hawaii. In 1885, the Meiji government began to turn to officially sponsored emigration programs to alleviate pressure from overpopulation and the effects of the Matsukata deflation in rural areas. For the next decade, the government was closely involved in the selection and pre-departure instruction of emigrants. The Japanese government was keen on keeping Japanese emigrants well-mannered while abroad in order to show the West that Japan was a dignified society, worthy of respect. By the mid-1890s, immigration companies (imin-kaisha, 移民会社), not sponsored by the government, began to dominate the process of recruiting emigrants, but government-sanctioned ideology continued to influence emigration patterns.

== Asia ==
=== Before 1945 ===
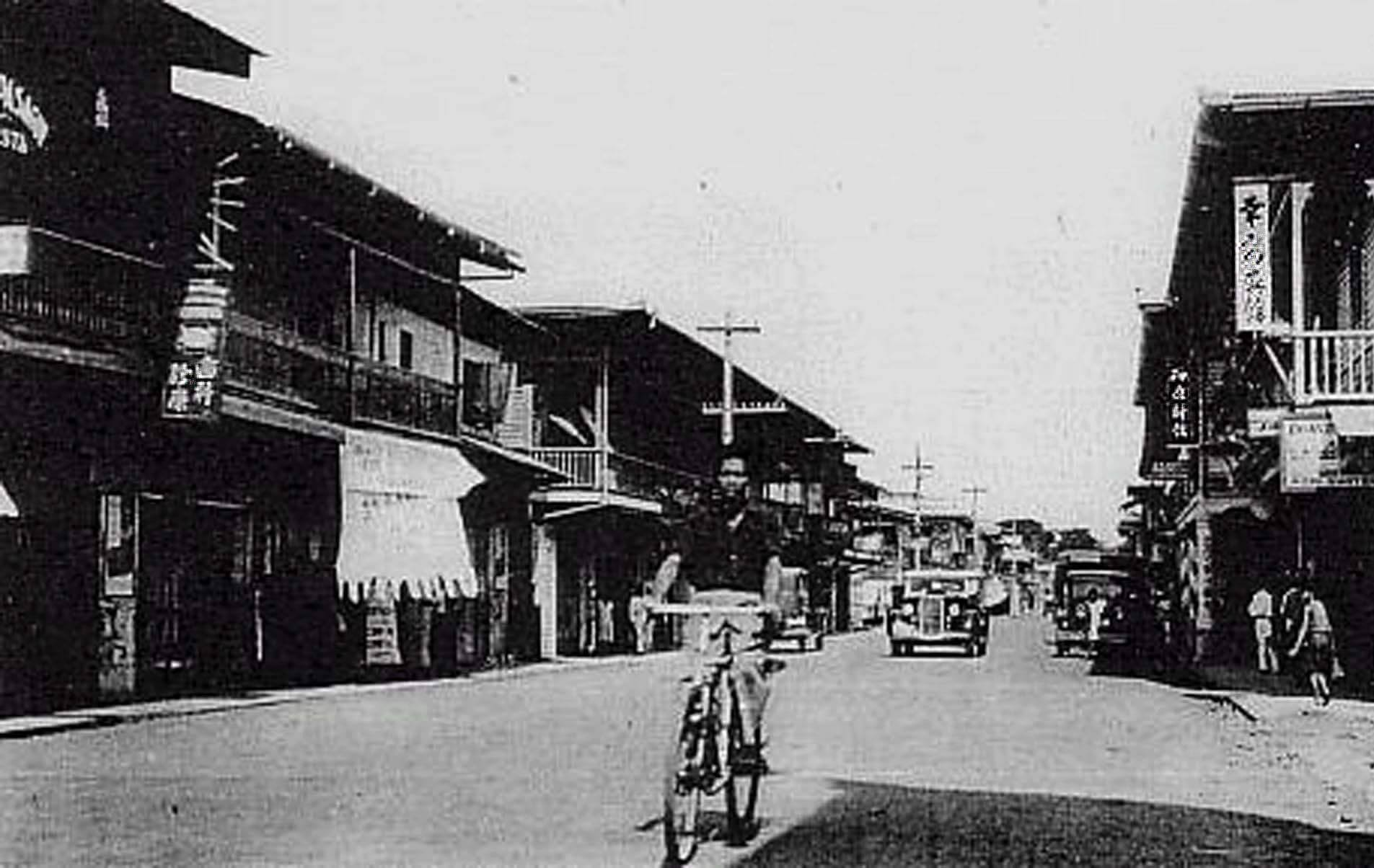
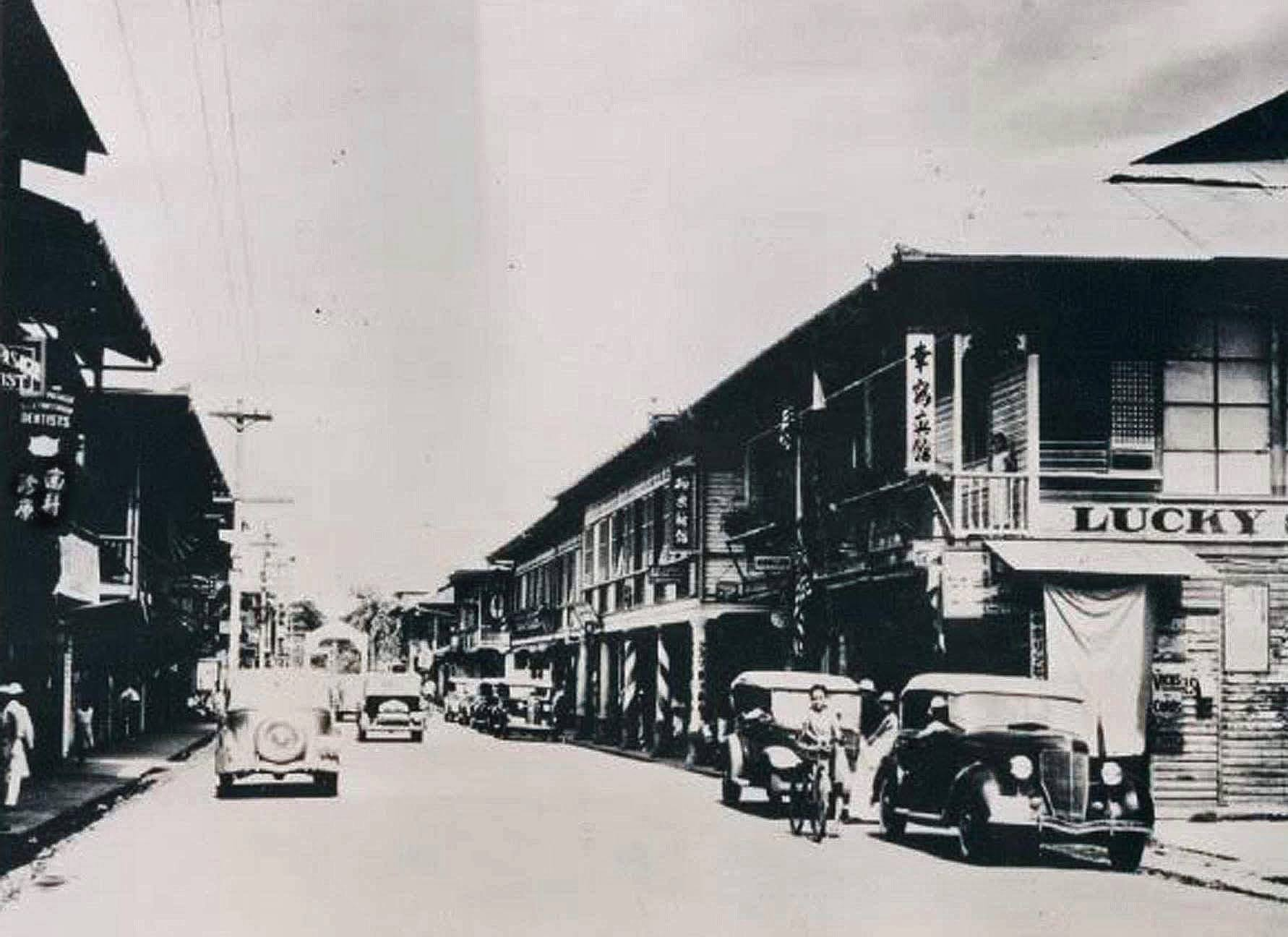
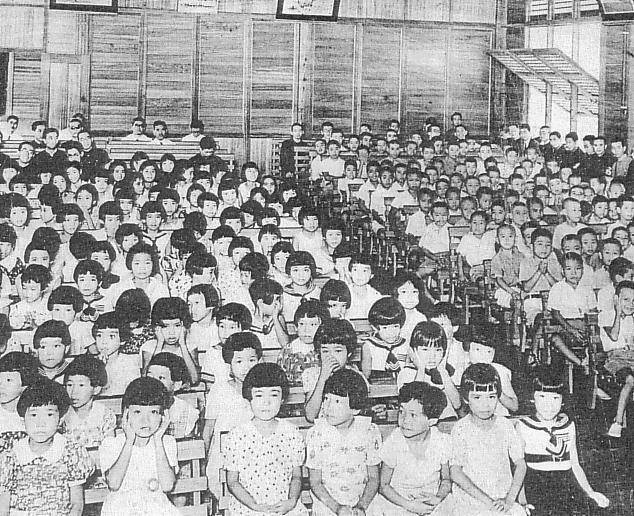
Little Tokyo in Davao City, Philippines (1936), Japanese school in Davao City (1939), where reportedly more than half of the students were mixed

In 1898, the Dutch East Indies colonial government statistics showed 614 Japanese in the Dutch East Indies (166 men, 448 women). During the American colonial era in the Philippines, the Japanese population of Davao, most of whom first started out as laborers working in abaca plantations in Davao, were recorded in statistics as only numbering 30 in 1903, then 5,533 by 1920, then 12,469 by 1930, then later increased to 20,000 by 1941. The number of Japanese laborers working in plantations rose so high that in the early 20th century, Davao City soon became dubbed as Davaokuo (in Philippine and American media) or (in Japanese: 小日本國「こにっぽんこく」, romanized: Ko Nippon Koku, lit. 'Little Japan') with a Japanese school, a Shinto shrine, and a diplomatic mission from Japan. The place that used to be "Little Tokyo" in Davao was Mintal. There is even a popular restaurant called "The Japanese Tunnel", which includes a tunnel made by the Japanese in time of the war.

In the Philippines, Halo-halo is believed to be an indigenized version of the Japanese kakigori class of desserts, originating from pre-war Japanese migrants into the islands. Odong or udong of Davao Region and Visayas is inspired by Japanese udon. During the early 1900s, there was a large community of Japanese laborers in Davao, half of them Okinawans, and in this period, the Japanese manufactured odong.

There was also a significant level of emigration to the overseas territories of the Empire of Japan during the Japanese colonial period, including Korea, Taiwan, Manchuria and Karafuto. Unlike emigrants to the Americas, Japanese going to the colonies occupied a higher rather than lower social niche upon their arrival.

In 1938 about 309,000 Japanese lived in Taiwan. By the end of World War II, there were over 850,000 Japanese in Korea and more than 2 million in China, most of them farmers in Manchukuo (the Japanese had a plan to bring in 5 million Japanese settlers into Manchukuo).

Over 400,000 people lived on Karafuto (Southern Sakhalin) when the Soviet offensive began in early August 1945. Most were of Japanese or Korean descent. When Japan lost the Kuril Islands, 17,000 Japanese were expelled, most from the southern islands.

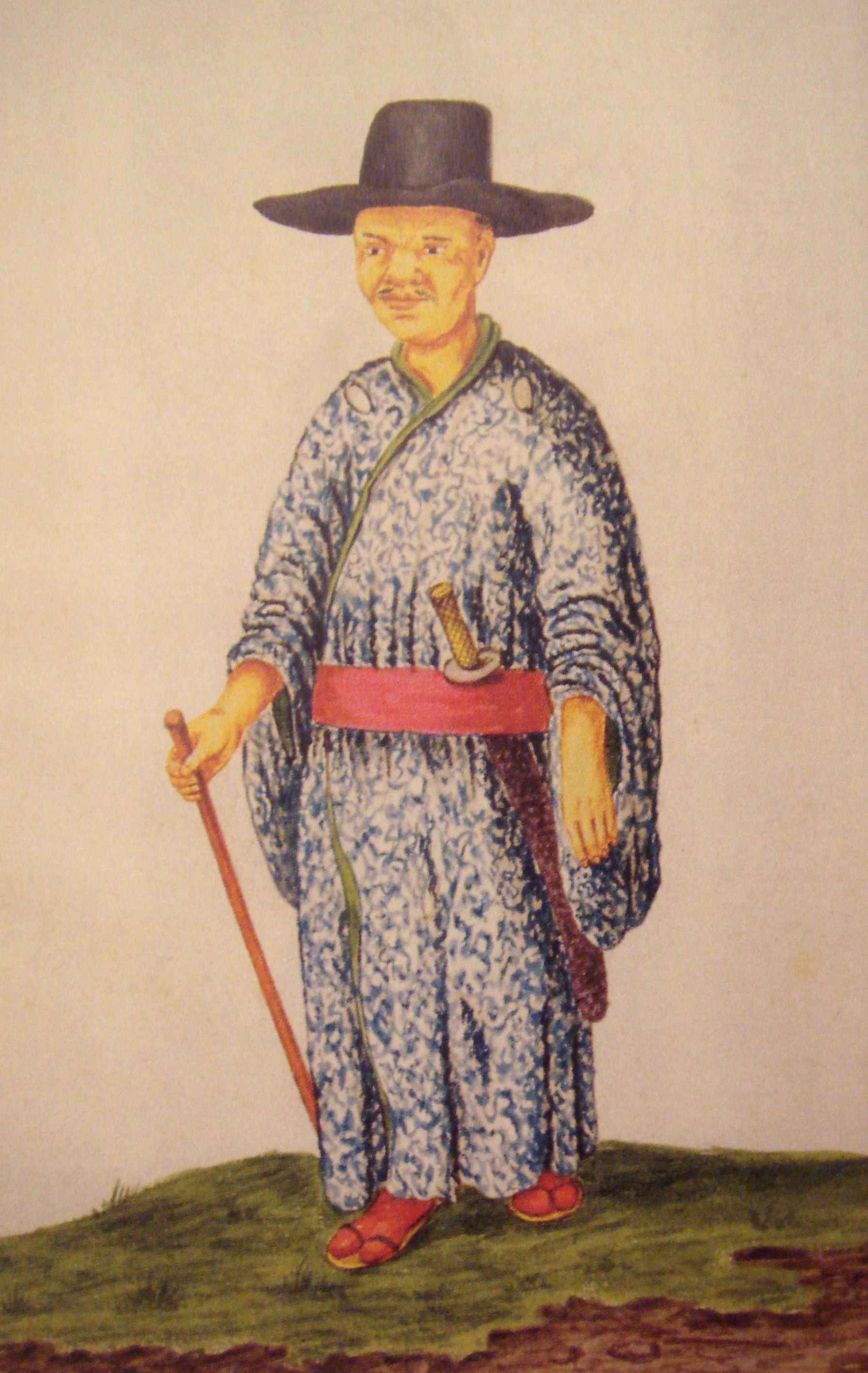
Japanese Christian in Jakarta, c. 1656

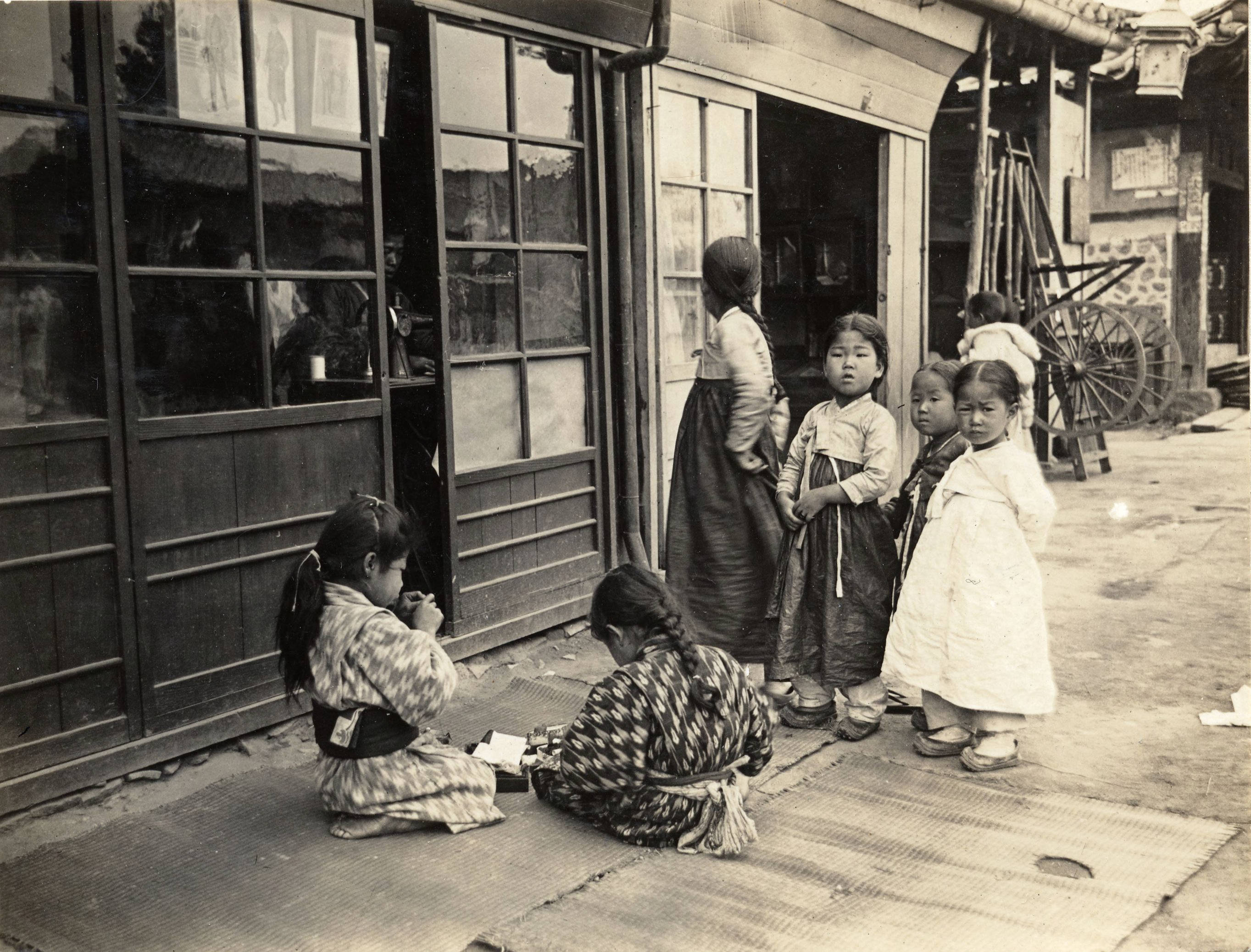
Japanese and Korean children, 1908–1922

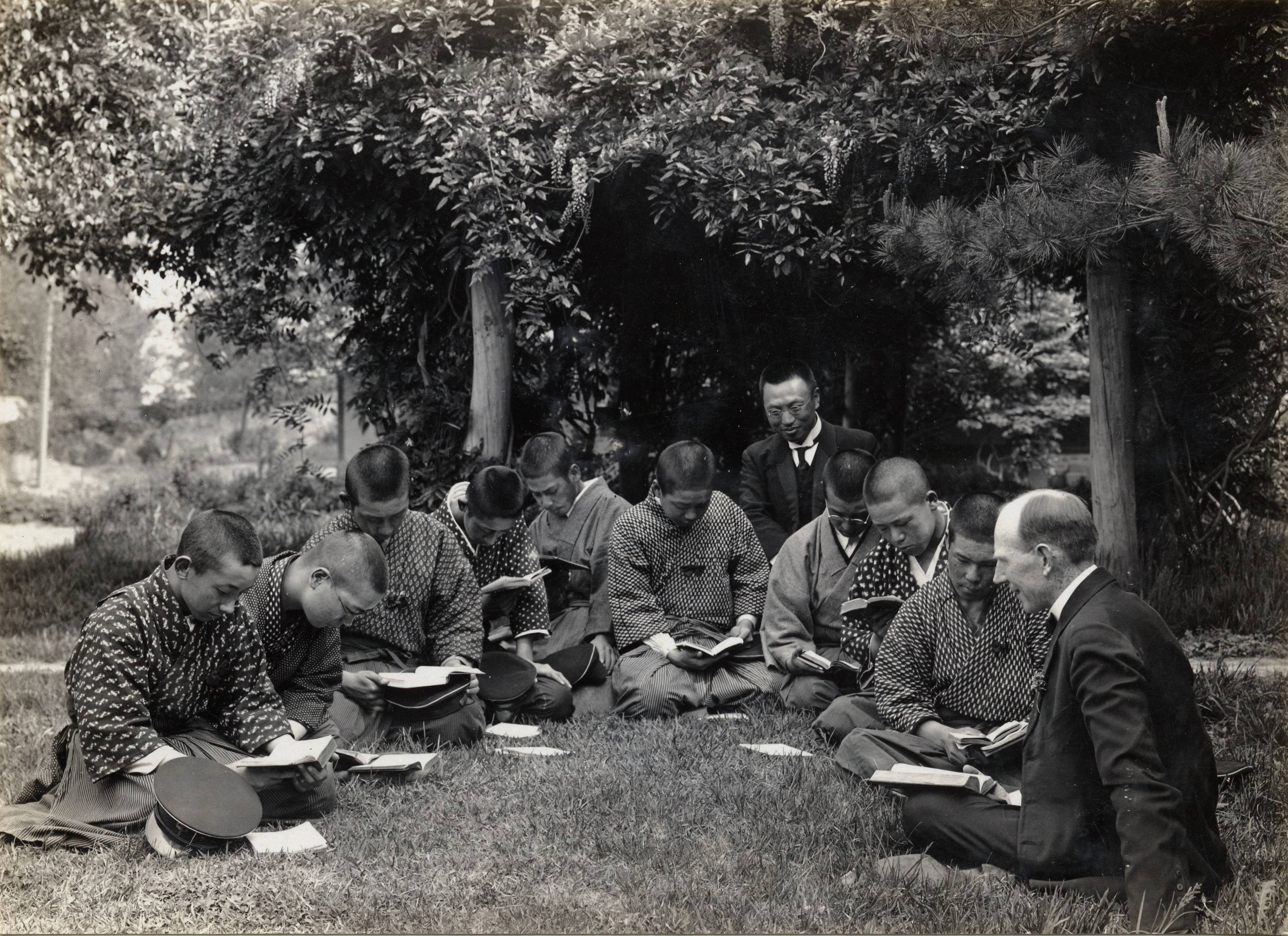
Japanese Sunday school class in Korea, 1908–1922

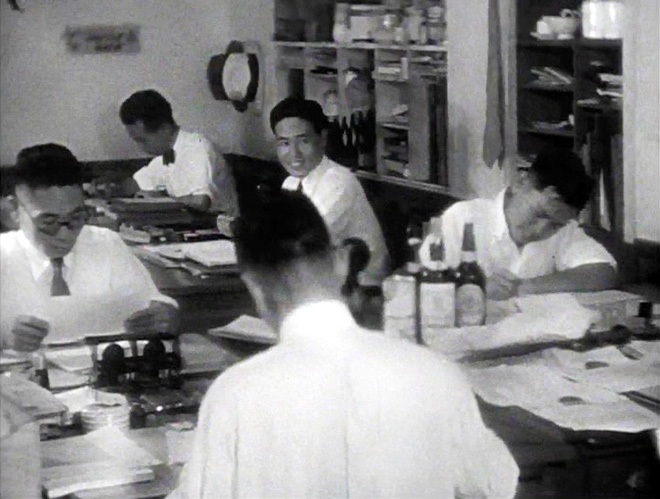
Japanese office workers in Manila, 1930s

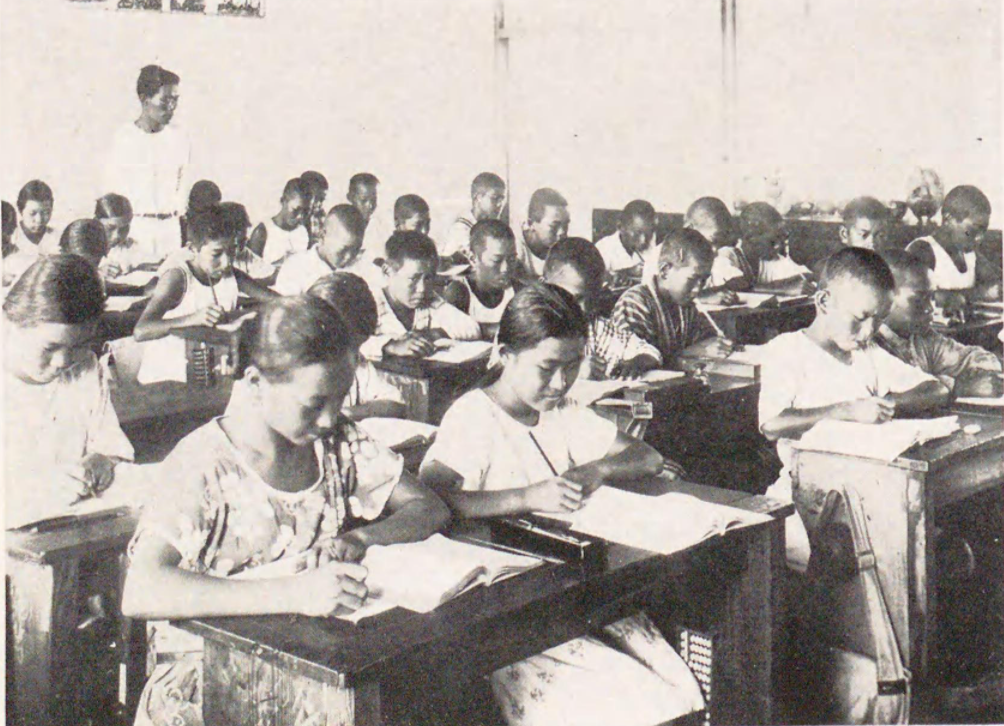
Japanese elementary school class on Saipan, 1932

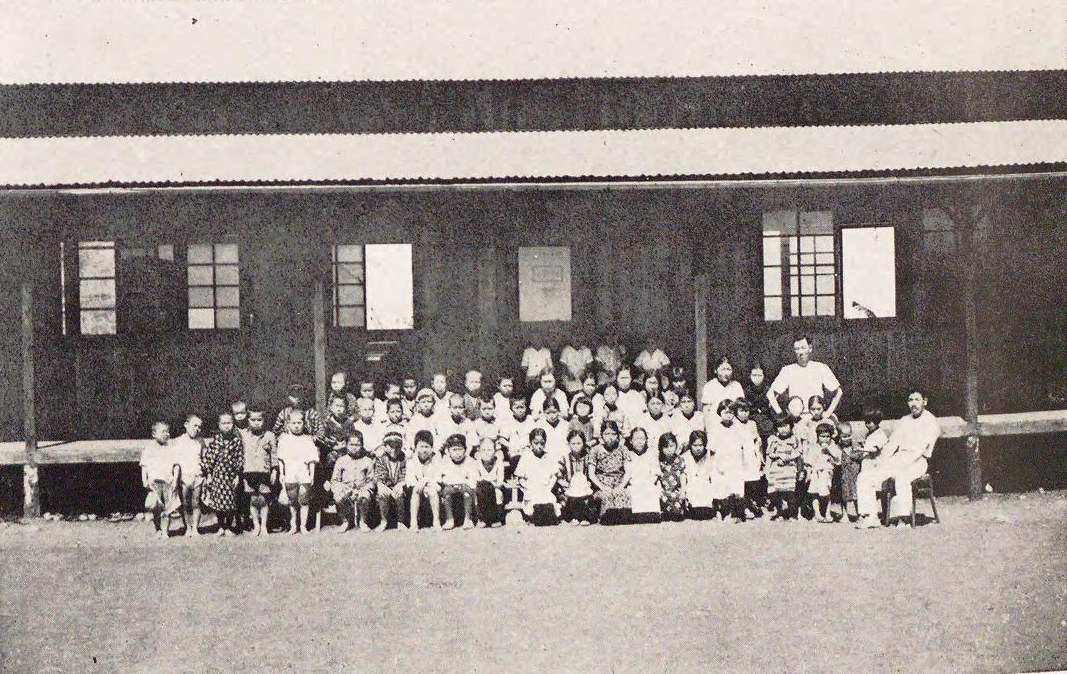
Japanese school on Tinian, 1932

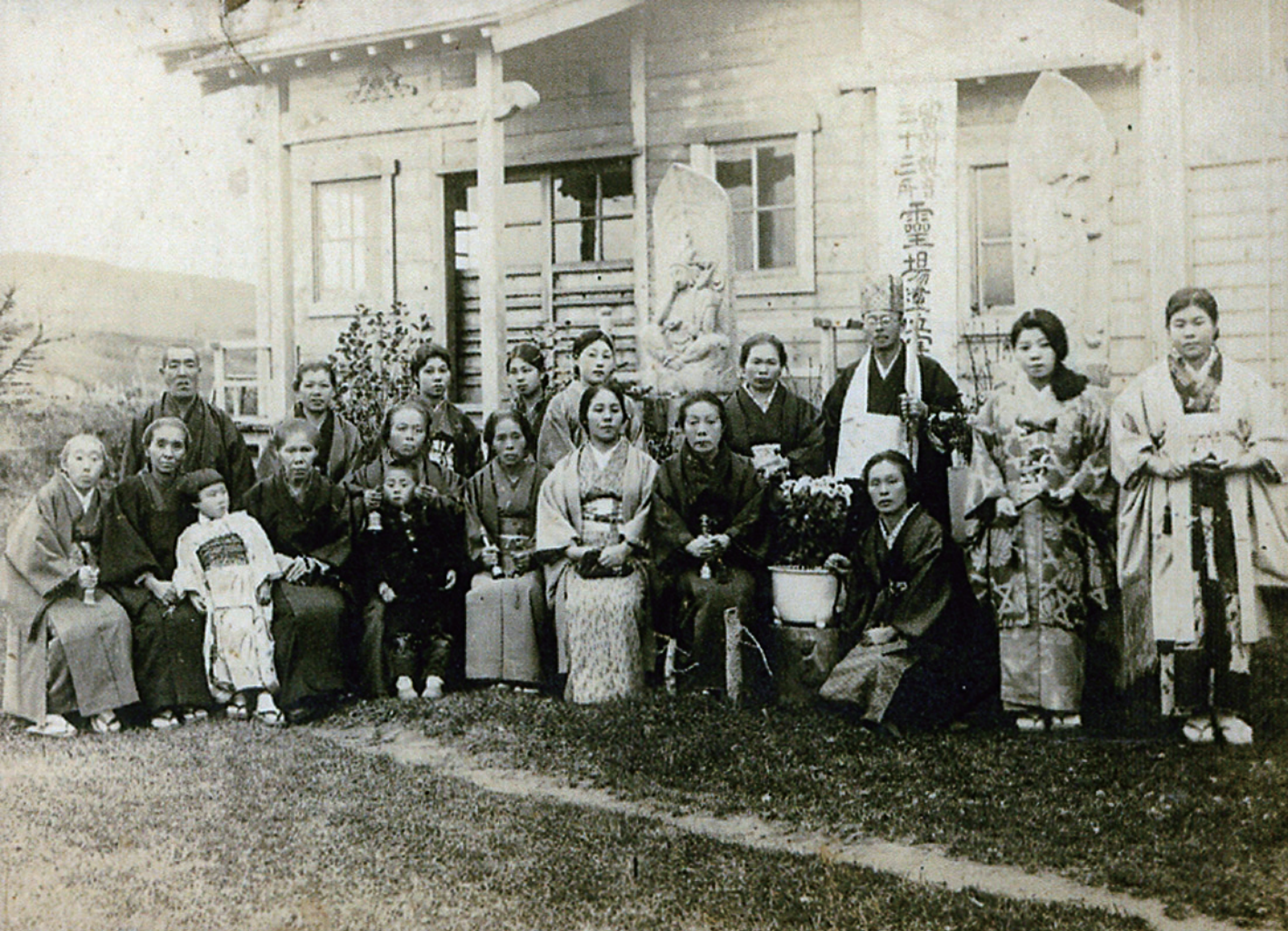
Japanese Buddhist temple on Etorofu, 1933

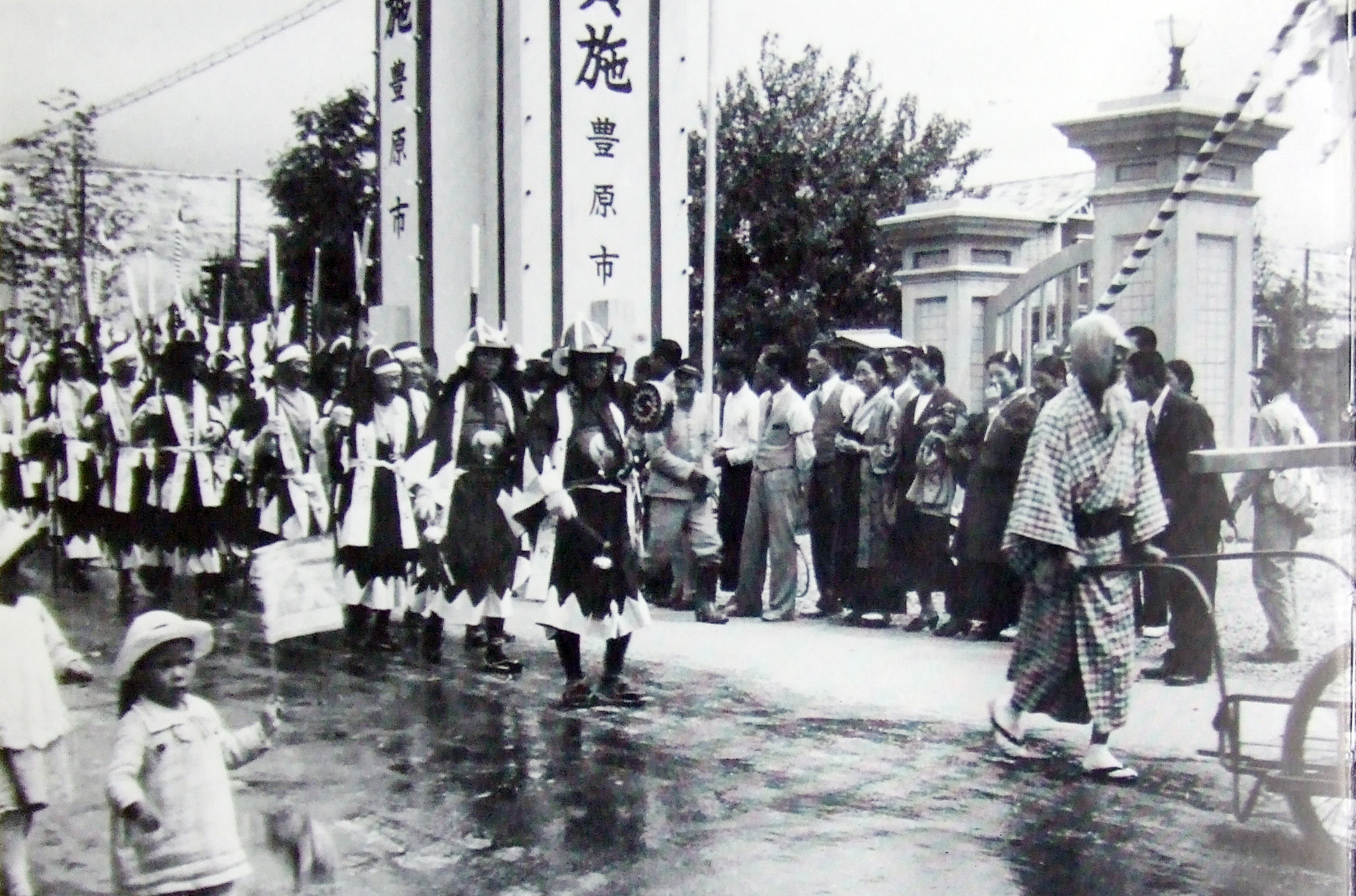
Japanese parade in Toyohara, 1937

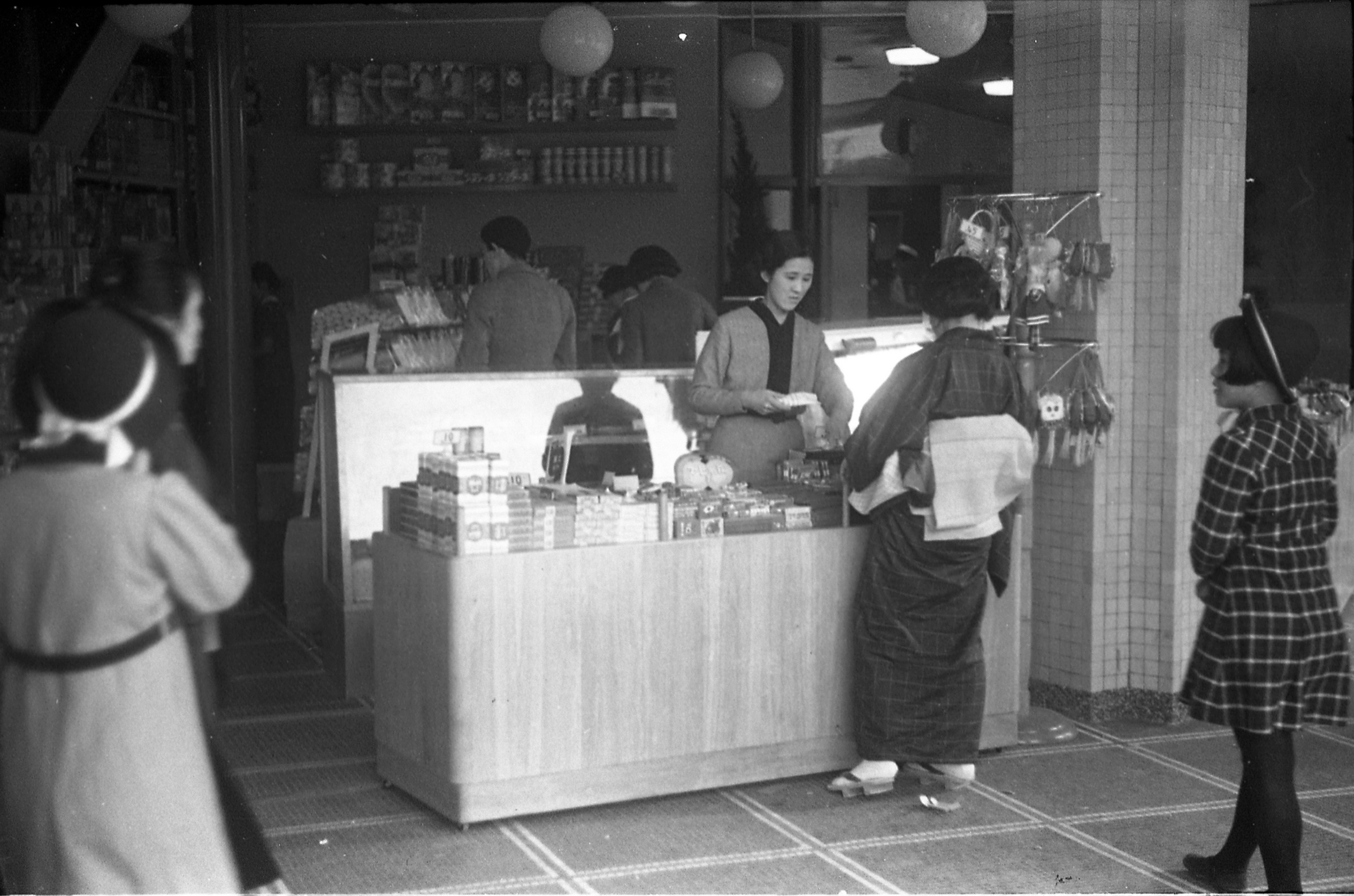
Japanese shoppers in Taihoku, 1939

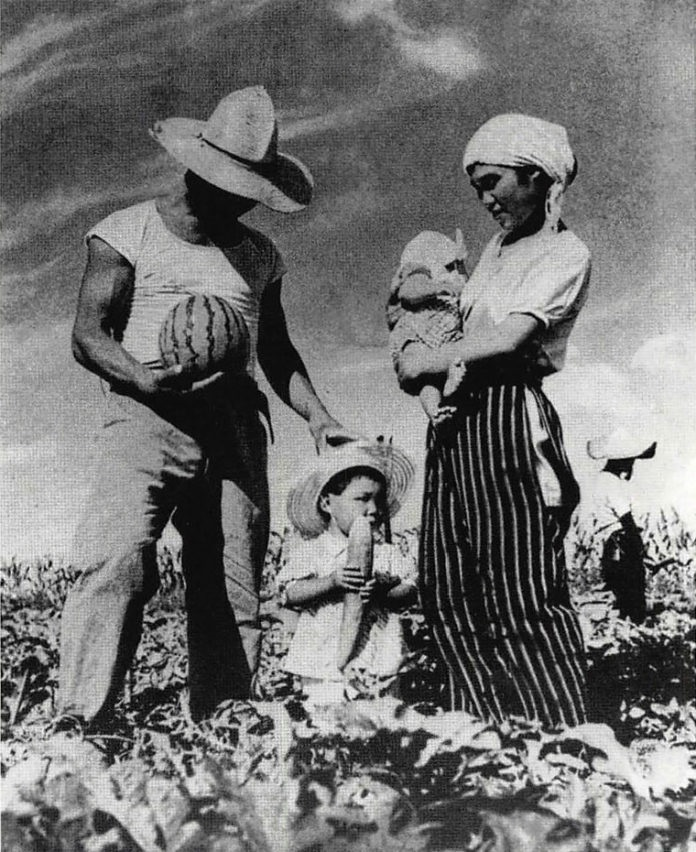
Japanese family in Manchukuo, 1940s

=== After 1945 ===
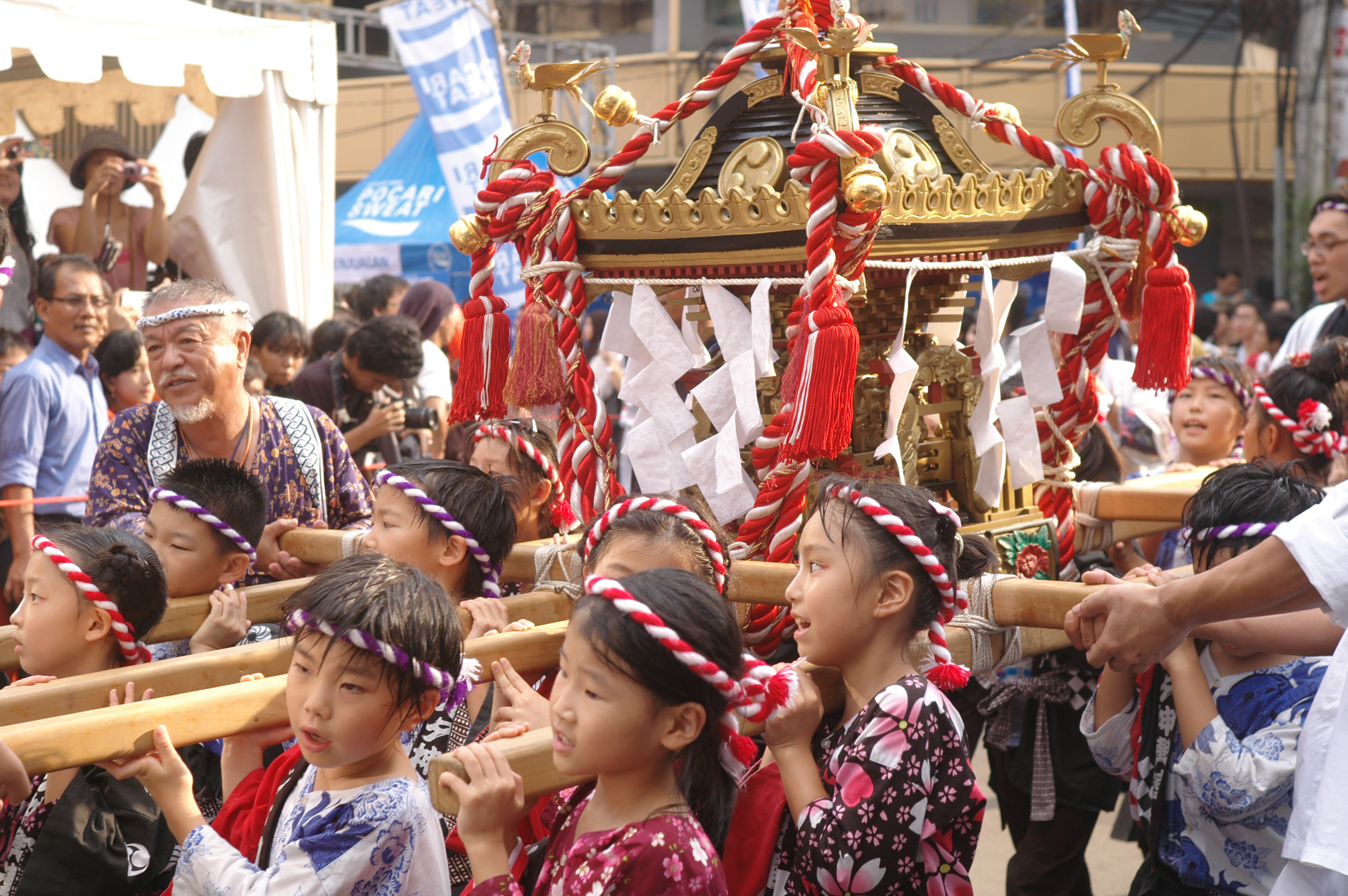
Mikoshi Parade (Mikoshi Kids), Ennichisai, Japanese community cultural festival in Blok M, Jakarta (2013)

During and after World War II, most of these overseas Japanese repatriated to Japan. The Allied powers repatriated over 6 million Japanese nationals from colonies and battlefields throughout Asia. Only a few remained overseas, often involuntarily, as in the case of orphans in China or prisoners of war captured by the Red Army and forced to work in Siberia. During the 1950s and 1960s, an estimated 6,000 Japanese accompanied Zainichi Korean spouses repatriating to North Korea, while another 27,000 prisoners-of-war are estimated to have been sent there by the Soviet Union; see Japanese people in North Korea.

There is a community of Japanese people in Hong Kong largely made up of expatriate businessmen. Additionally, there are 19,612 Japanese expatriates in Indonesia based mostly in the cities of Jakarta and Bali.

== Americas ==
The Japanese diaspora has been unique in the absence of new emigration flows in the second half of the 20th century. However, research reports that during the post-war many Japanese migrated individually to join existing communities abroad.

=== North America ===
People from Japan began migrating to the U.S. and Canada in significant numbers following the political, cultural and social changes stemming from the 1868 Meiji Restoration. (see Japanese Americans and Japanese Canadians)

==== Canada ====
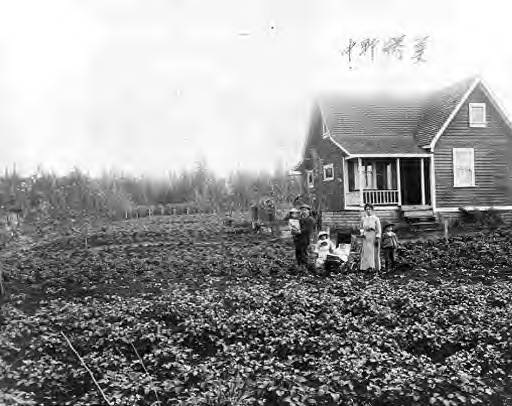
View of Ujo Nakano's farm house at Port Hammond, B.C.

In Canada, small multi-generational communities of Japanese immigrants developed and adapted to life outside Japan.

==== Caribbean ====
There was a small amount of Japanese settlement in the Dominican Republic between 1956 and 1961, in a program initiated by Dominican Republic leader Rafael Trujillo. Protests over the extreme hardships and broken government promises faced by the initial group of migrants set the stage for the end of state-supported labor emigration in Japan.

==== Mexico ====
Mexico received Japanese immigrants in 1897, when the first thirty five arrived in Chiapas to work on coffee farms. Immigration into Mexico died down in the following years, but was eventually spurred again in 1903 due to the acceptance of mutually recognized contracts on immigration by both countries. Immigrants coming in the first four years of these contracts worked primarily on sugar plantations, coal mines, and railroads. Japanese immigrants (particularly from the Okinawa Prefecture, including Okinawans) arrived in small numbers during the early 20th century.

==== United States ====
In the United States, particularly after the Chinese Exclusion Act of 1882, Japanese immigrants were sought by industrialists to replace Chinese immigrants. In the early 20th century, anxiety about the rapid growth of cheap Japanese labor in California came to a head in 1906, when the School Board of San Francisco passed a resolution barring children of Japanese heritage from attending regular public schools. President Roosevelt intervened to rescind the resolution, but only on the understanding that steps would be taken to put a stop to further Japanese immigration. In 1907, in the face of Japanese government protests, the so-called "Gentlemen's Agreement" between the governments of Japan and the United States ended immigration of Japanese workers (i.e., men), but permitted the immigration of spouses of Japanese immigrants already in the US. The Immigration Act of 1924 banned the immigration of all but a token few Japanese, and until the Immigration Act of 1965, there was very little further Japanese immigration. But afterward, the Japanese American community increased heavily.

The state with the highest percentage of Japanese people is Hawaii, where today a third of the people are of Japanese descent. The majority of Japanese Americans live on the West Coast, with other significant communities in the Southwest, Northeast and Midwest.

=== South America ===
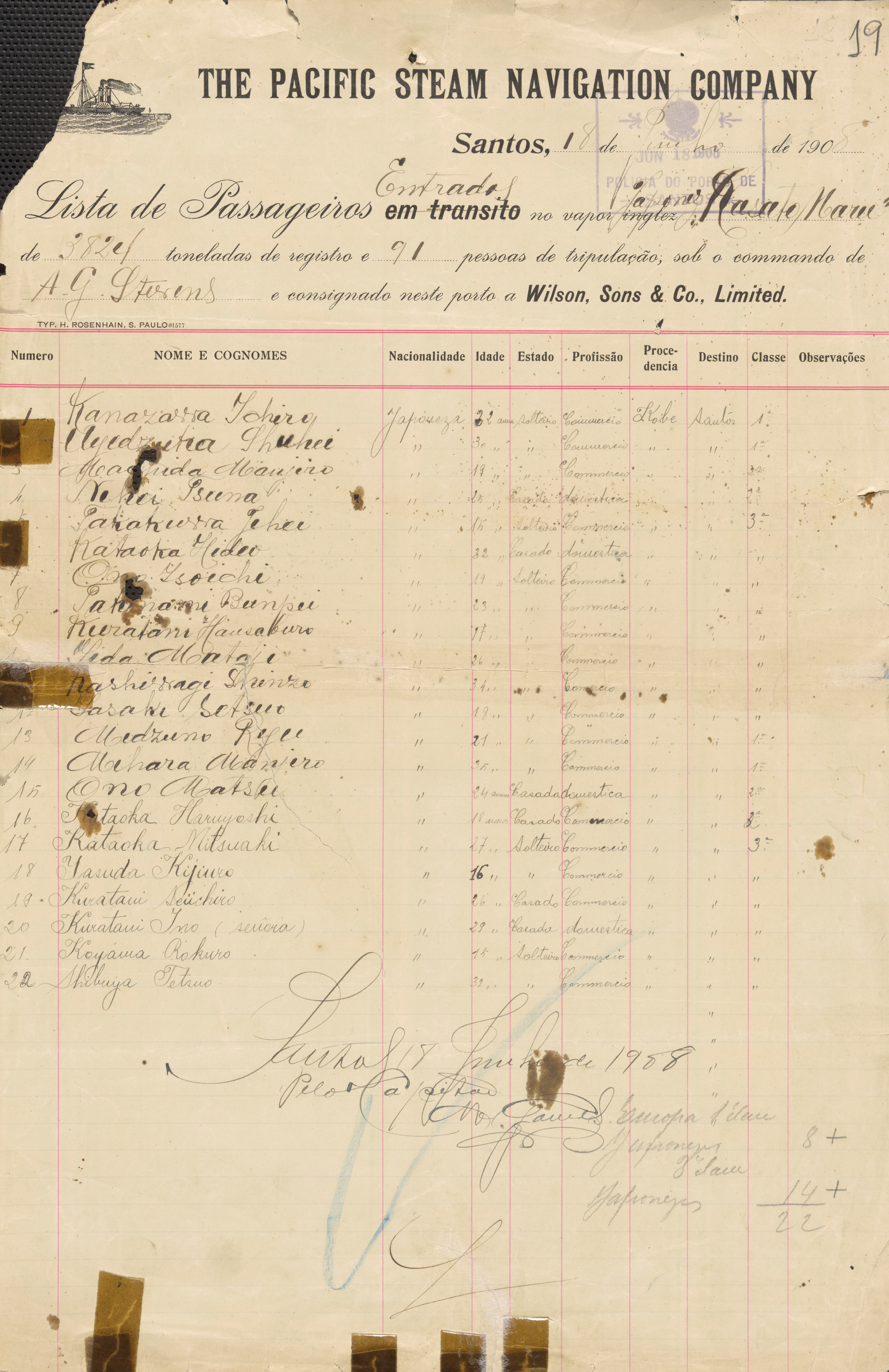
List of passengers of the ship Kasato Maru bringing the first Japanese immigrants to Brazil, 1908

==== Argentina ====
Argentina is home to about 80,000 people of Japanese descent. Most of them live in Buenos Aires, where neighborhoods like Balvanera and Monserrat have many Japanese restaurants, shops and izakayas. Buenos Aires also has the largest Japanese garden outside Japan, called Jardín Japonés, located in Palermo neighborhood.

==== Brazil ====
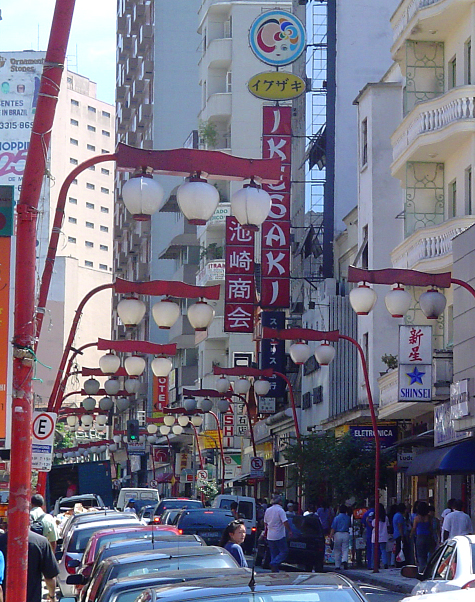
The Japanese community of the city of São Paulo, Brazil, traditionally lived in the Liberdade neighbourhood.

Japanese Brazilians are the largest ethnic Japanese community outside Japan (numbering about 2 million, compared to about 1.5 million in the United States) and São Paulo contains the largest concentration of Japanese outside Japan. Paraná and Mato Grosso do Sul also have a large Japanese community. The first Japanese immigrants (791 people, mostly farmers) came to Brazil in 1908 on the Kasato Maru from the Japanese port of Kobe, moving to Brazil in search of better living conditions. Many of them ended up as laborers on coffee farms (for testimony of Kasato Maru's travelers that continued to Argentina see es:Café El Japonés, see also Shindo Renmei). Immigration of Japanese workers in Brazil was actually subsidized by São Paulo up until 1921, with around 40,000 Japanese emigrating to Brazil between the years of 1908 and 1925, and 150,000 pouring in during the following 16 years. The most immigrants to come in one year peaked in 1933 at 24,000, but restrictions due to ever growing anti-Japanese sentiment caused it to die down and then eventually halt at the start of World War II. Japanese immigration into Brazil actually saw continued traffic after it resumed in 1951. Around 60,000 entered the country between 1951 and 1981, with a sharp decline occurring in the 1960s due to a resurgence of Japan's domestic economy.

==== Colombia ====
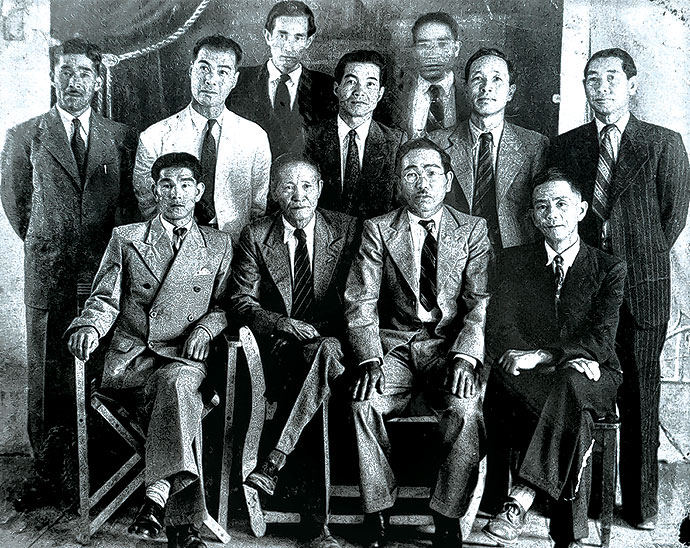
Immigrants from Japan in Palmira, Cauca (Colombia)

The Japanese Colombian colony migrated between 1929 and 1935 in three waves. Their community is unique in terms of their resistance against the internal conflict occurring in Colombia during the decade of the 1950s, a period known as La Violencia.

==== Paraguay ====
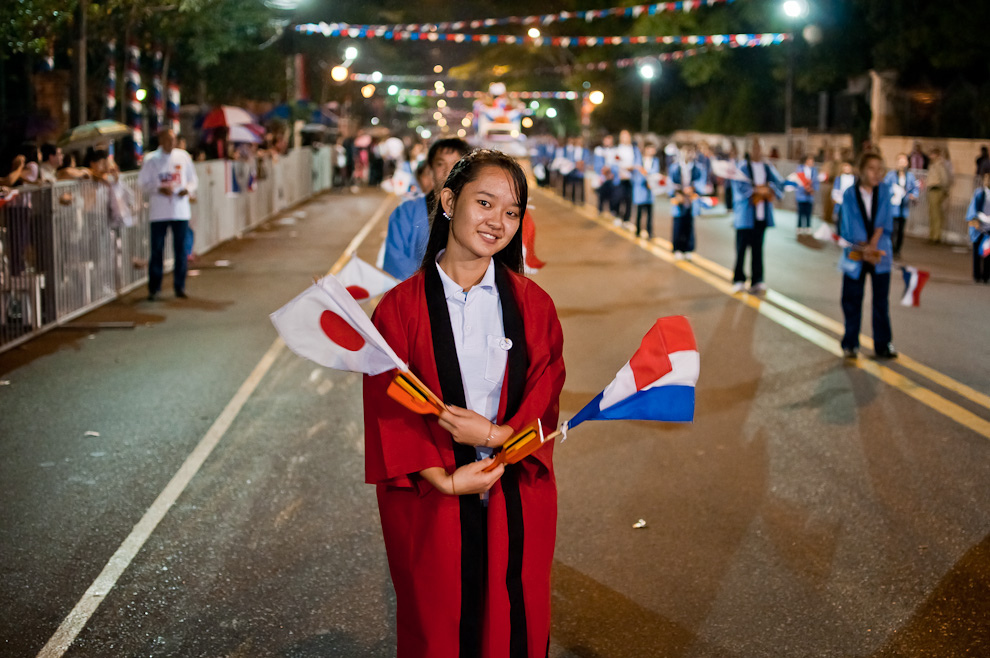
A dancer poses with the flags of Paraguay and Japan during the multicultural parade celebrating the bicentennial of Paraguayan independence

Japanese immigration to Paraguay began in the early 20th century, as part of the migratory movements promoted by the Paraguayan government to populate and develop rural areas. The first organized contingent arrived during the second half of the 1930s and settled mainly in agricultural areas, where immigrants introduced new farming techniques and forms of cooperative organization. Over the following decades, the Japanese community consolidated itself through the founding of agricultural colonies, such as La Colmena, which contributed significantly to regional economic development.

==== Peru ====
Japanese Peruvians form another notable ethnic Japanese community with an estimated 6,000 Issei and 100,000 Japanese descendants (Nisei, Sansei, Yonsei), including a former Peruvian president, Alberto Fujimori. Japanese food known as Nikkei cuisine is a rich part of Peruvian-Japanese culture, which includes the use of seaweed broth and sushi-inspired versions of ceviche. As a result of Peru's gastronomic revolution and global gastrodiplomacy campaign, Nikkei is now recognized among international culinary networks as a cuisine that is a unique fusion of Japanese and Peruvian influences. This recognition has created revenues for Japanese-Peruvian communities in Lima and enabled Nikkei chefs to open up restaurants in other metropolitan cities around the world.

== Europe ==
Some of the earliest immigrants to Europe include delegates from Hasekura Tsunenaga's Keichō Embassy to Europe between 1613 and 1620. A retainer of Kirishitan daimyo Date Masamune, Hasekura was sent on a diplomatic mission to meet with Pope Paul V, and request for a trade treaty between Japan and Mexico. As the representative of a regional lord not necessarily reflecting the polices of the shogunate, he and his delegation were forced to spend a couple months in the Spanish town of Coria del Río while they awaited word from Vatican authorities giving them permission to proceed through to France and Italy. Upon completion of their mission, most of the delegation returned to Japan, however a couple members decided to remain behind, and to this day, some 600 people out of a population of 30,000 still carries the last name Japon in the town, derived from Hasekura de Japon, roughly 15 generations later.

=== Spain ===
In all, there are approximately 10,000 people who currently identify as Japanese in Spain between expatriate managers at Japanese corporations, international students, migrants from Nikkei populations in Latin America, and the descendants of Hasekura's Keichō Embassy.

=== United Kingdom ===
The Japanese community United Kingdom dates back to the students sent by the Bakufu government following the Anglo-Japanese Treaty of Amity and Commerce in 1863. Today, they currently number some 64,000 residents of Japanese extraction in the UK. The Japanese community in the UK includes Sir Kazuo Ishiguro, Dame Mitsuko Uchida, and date back to Prime Minister Itō Hirobumi, who was a member of the Chōshū Five.

=== Russia ===
There are also small numbers of Japanese people in Russia some whose heritage date back to the times when both countries shared the territories of Sakhalin and the Kuril Islands; some Japanese communists settled in the Soviet Union, including Mutsuo Hakamada, the brother of former Japanese Communist Party chairman Satomi Hakamada, whose daughter Irina Hakamada is a notable Russian political figure. The 2002 Russian census showed 835 people claiming Japanese ethnicity (nationality).

=== Germany ===
Germany became a favorite destination for overseas Japanese education and investment in the Interwar period prior to the signing of the Tripartite Pact in World War 2, with almost 20% of the Japanese expat community living in Berlin. Today, they number 78,423 people with Japanese ancestry with more than half German citizens.

There is a sizable Japanese community in Düsseldorf, Germany of nearly 8,400 (as of 2018) Japanese nationals (not ethnics). Many of them are expatriates who stay there only for a few years.

== Oceania ==
Early Japanese immigrants were particularly prominent in Broome, Western Australia, where until the Second World War they were the largest ethnic group, who were attracted to the opportunities in pearling. Several streets of Broome have Japanese names, and the town has one of the largest Japanese cemeteries outside Japan. Other immigrants were involved in the sugar cane industry in Queensland. During the Second World War, the Japanese population was detained and later expelled at the cessation of hostilities. The Japanese population in Australia was later replenished in the 1950s by the arrival of 500 Japanese war brides, who had married AIF soldiers stationed in occupied Japan. In recent years, Japanese migration to Australia, largely consisting of younger age females, has been on the rise.

There is also a small but growing Japanese community in New Zealand, primarily in Auckland and Wellington.

In the census of December 1939, the total population of the South Seas Mandate was 129,104, of which 77,257 were Japanese. By December 1941, Saipan had a population of more than 30,000 people, including 25,000 Japanese. There are Japanese people in Palau, Guam and Northern Mariana Islands.

== Return migration to Japan ==
In the 1980s, with Japan's growing economy facing a shortage of workers willing to do so-called three K jobs (きつい, kitsui [difficult], 汚い, kitanai [dirty] and 危険, kiken [dangerous]), Japan's Ministry of Labor began to grant visas to ethnic Japanese from South America to come to Japan and work in factories. The vast majority—estimated at 300,000—were from Brazil, but there is also a large population from Peru and smaller populations from other South American countries.

As a response to the Great Recession, the Japanese government offered ¥300,000 ($3,300) for unemployed Japanese descendants from South America to return to their country of origin with the stated goal of alleviating the country's worsening labor shortage. Another ¥200,000 ($2,200) is offered for each additional family member to leave. Emigrants who took this offer were not allowed to return to Japan with the same privileged visa with which they had entered the country. Arudou Debito, columnist for English-language newspaper The Japan Times, denounced the policy as "racist" as it only offered Japanese-blooded foreigners who possessed the special "person of Japanese ancestry" visa the option to receive money in return for repatriation to their home countries. Some commentators also accused it of being exploitative since most nikkei had been offered incentives to immigrate to Japan in 1990, were regularly reported to work 60+ hours per week, and were finally asked to return home when the Japanese became unemployed in large numbers. At the same time, return migration to Japan, along with repatriation to their home countries, has also created complex relationships with both their homeland and hostland, a condition which has been called a "'squared diaspora' in which the juxtaposition of homeland and hostland itself becomes questionable, instable and fluctuating." This has also taken on new forms of circular migration as first and second generation nikkei travel back and forth between Japan and their home countries.

== Statistics ==
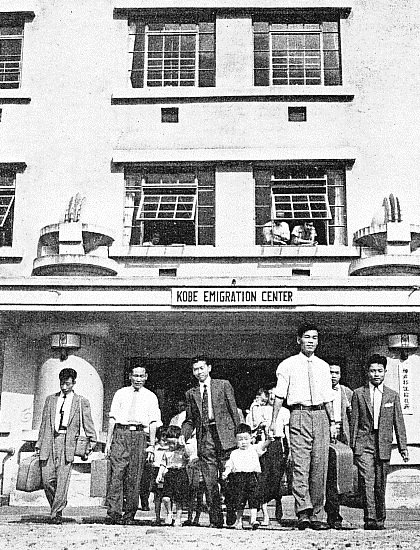
Japanese emigrants at the Kobe Emigration Center (now Kōbe Center for Overseas Migration and Cultural Interaction), 1956.

=== Major cities with significant populations of Japanese nationals ===
City	Country	Japanese population
Los Angeles	United States	63,972
Bangkok	Thailand	51,297
New York City	United States	38,251
Singapore	Singapore	33,397
Shanghai	China	31,733
Sydney	Australia	31,673
Greater London	United Kingdom	30,515
Vancouver	Canada	28,090
Honolulu	United States	23,254
Hong Kong	China	23,228
San Francisco	United States	20,621
Melbourne	Australia	19,671
Toronto	Canada	18,101
San Jose	United States	16,781
Seoul	South Korea	14,496
Seattle	United States	13,788
São Paulo	Brazil	12,000
Brisbane	Australia	11,672
Gold Coast	Australia	11,148
Chicago	United States	11,111
Auckland	New Zealand	10,952
Paris	France	10,037
Taipei	Taiwan	9,693
Kuala Lumpur	Malaysia	9,269
Ho Chi Minh City	Vietnam	9,249
Total		561,039

Note: The above data shows the number of Japanese nationals living overseas as of 1 October 2025, according to the Ministry of Foreign Affairs of Japan.

=== Births outside Japan to parents with Japanese nationality ===
Source: Ministry of Health, Labour and Welfare

	Total births	Live births to mixed- nationality parents	Live births to two Japanese nationals
2015	14,723	9,920	4,803
2016	14,465	9,747	4,718
2017	13,817	9,152	4,665
2018	13,366	8,776	4,590
2019	12,724	8,418	4,306
2020	11,439	7,697	3,742
2021	11,009	7,420	3,589
2022	10,746	7,196	3,550
2023	10,331	6,782	3,549

== See also ==
- Issei, Nisei, Sansei, Yonsei & Gosei
- Buddhist Churches of America
- Honpa Hongwanji Mission of Hawaii & Hawaii Shingon Mission
- Gedatsu Church of America
- Jodo Shinshu Buddhist Temples of Canada
- South America Hongwanji Mission
- List of Shinto shrines in the United States
- Saipan Katori Shrine
- Dom Justo Takayama
