= Pan American Nikkei Association =

The Pan American Nikkei Association - PANA, the English-language name of the Asociación Panamericana Nikkei- APN, is a multinational, nongovernmental organization. Member countries are Argentina, Bolivia, Brazil, Canada, Chile, Colombia, Japan, Mexico, Paraguay, Peru, Dominican Republic, Uruguay, Venezuela, and the United States.

== History ==
In 1981, Mexican Nikkei organized the first convention. Its character was summarized in a slogan: "Let us be better citizens in our continent" (Seamos mejores ciudadanos en nuestro contiente). Delegates from Argentina, Brazil, Colombia, Peru and the United States joined the Mexican organizers for this initial meeting in Mexico City.

== Presidents ==
Presidents have a term of two years. They could be reelected for one term.

- 2024-2026 Mr. Valter Sassaki from Brazil
- 2017-2024 Mr. Fernando Suenaga from Peru (reelected in 2019, Amended Presidency 2021 to 2024)
- 2013-2017 Mr. Arturo Yoshimoto from USA (reelected in 2015)
- 2009-2013 Mr. Noritaka Yano from Brazil (reelected in 2011)
- 2005-2009 Mr. Felix Kasamatsu from Paraguay (reelected in 2007)
- 2001-2005 Mr. Kazunori Kosaka from Argentina (reelected in 2003)
- 1999-2001 Mr. Carlos Kasuga from Mexico
- 1995-1999 Mr. Luis Sakoda from Peru
- 1981-1995 Mr. Carlos Kasuga from Mexico

== Biennial COPANI conventions ==
The Conventions of the Pan American Nikkei (COPANI) or PANA conventions are an opportunity for the nikkei from North, Central and South America to share and discuss issues and events with cultural, historical, political and economic consequences that transcend national borders. These gatherings foster idea exchange and create a forum for personal interaction.

The biennial conventions are intended to promotes closer relationships amongst the Nikkei organizations in the Western Hemisphere. PANA conventions are planned in alternating locations amongst North, Central and South American countries.

The Conventions of the Association of Pan American Nikkei have enlarged across the span of time:

- 1981—The 1st (COPANI I)convention in Mexico City, Mexico brought together delegates from six countries. Mr. Carlos Kasuga President of the COPANI Committee
- 1983—The 2nd convention (COPANI II) was held in Peru.
- 1985—The 3rd convention (COPANI III) was in Brazil. Mr. Masahiko Tisaka, President of COPANI.
- 1987—The 4th convention (COPANI IV) took place in Argentina.Mr. Malio Sakata President of the COPANI Committee
- 1989—The 5th assembly (COPANI V) was held in the United States at Los Angeles. Mr. Noritoshi Kanai President of the COPANI Committee
- 1991—The 6th convention (COPANI VI) was hosted by Paraguay's Nikkei.
- 1993—The 7th gathering (COPANI VII) in Vancouver, Canada brought together 400 delegates from 11 countries.Mr. Mark Ando President of the COPANI Committee
- 1995—The 8th assembly (COPANI VIII) in Lima, Peru.
- 1997—The 9th convention (COPANI IX) took place in Mexico. Mr. Carlos Kasuga President of the COPANI Committee
- 1999—The 10th convention (COPANI X) was held in Chile.
- 2001—The 11th convention (COPANI XI) was hosted by the United States Nikkei at New York City. Mr. Francis Sogi President of the COPANI Committee
- 2003—The 12th convention (COPANI XII) was hosted by the Bolivian membership.
- 2005—The 13th convention (COPANI XIII) in Vancouver, Canada was actively supported by the National Association of Japanese Canadians.Mr. Arthur Miki President of the COPANI Committee.
- 2007—The 14th Convencion Panamericana Nikkei (COPANI XIV) in São Paulo, Brazil was organized in part by Zaidan Hojin Kaigai Nikkeijin Kyokai. Approximately 700 attended. Mr. Noritaka Yano President of the COPANI Committee.
- 2009—The 15th Convention(COPANI XV) was held in the city of Montevideo, Uruguay. Mr. Emilio Ohno President of the COPANI Committee
- 2011 - The 16th Copani (COPANI XVI) was held in Cancun, Mexico under the leadership of young Nikkeis from Mexico. Mr. Hiro Kashiwagui President of the COPANI Committee
- 2013 - The 17th Copani (COPANI XVII) was held in Buenos Aires, Argentina on September 12–14, 2013. Approximately 500 Attended. Supported by the Centro Nikkei Argentino and a youth staff of approximately 80 young Argentinian Nikkeis. Mr. Sebastian Kakazu President of the COPANI Committee
- 2015 - The 18th Copani (COPANI XVIII) was held in Dominican Republic on August 6–8, 2015. Sponsored by FUNDONI ( Fundacion Dominicana Nikkei - Foundation of the Dominican Nikkei) See www.copani.org Ms. Eiko Kokubun President of the COPANI Committee.
- 2017 - The 19th Copani (COPANI XIX) was held in Lima - Peru in 2017 Theme" Building our Future" (Spanish "Contruyendo Nuestro Futuro").Mr. Juan Carlos Nakasone President of the COPANI Committee.
- 2019 - The 20th Copani (COPANI XX) was held in the USA - San Francisco, California on September 20–22, 2019. "The Future is Here."(Spanish "El Futuro es Ahora") Mr. Norman Mineta (Transportation Secretary-President Bush)attended as keynote speaker. About 250 participated. Mr. Roger (Roji) Oyama President of the COPANI Committee.
- 2021 - No Convention -The 21st Copani (COPANI XXI) will be held in Asuncion - Paraguay. Postponed to 2024 due to COVID-19 pandemic in Paraguay.
- 2024-The 21st Copani (COPANI XXI) was held on September 5-8, 2024 in Asuncion-Paraguay with a theme "Building Alliances for a sustainable future" (Construyendo Alianzas para un futuro Sostenible) & OÑONDIVEPA (in Guarani, in English "All together, all United", in Spanish "todos juntos, todos unidos"). Mr. Richard Moriya, President of the COPANI XXI Committee. Organized by Centro Nikkei Paraguayo (Nikkei Center of Paraguay) presided by Miss Stefany Masako Seki. About 500 people attended. Mrs. Minako Suematsu (the Japan Times, President) attended as the main keynote speaker. A new set of bylaws were adopted during the delegates meeting.
- 2026 - The 22nd COPANI (COPANI XXII) will be held in São Paulo, Brazil on June 5th-7th, 2025. This year's COPANI theme is "Liderando a Mudança" (Leading the Change). Mr. Claudio Kurita is the President of the XX COPANI. Information and signup at http://www.copanibrasil.com.br, https://www.instagram.com/copani.apn.
- 2028 - The 23rd COPANI to be announced.

== Important dates ==
- 2018

International Nikkei Day (Dia Internacional del Nikkei) on June 20 of each year starting from 2018. Decided by The Association of Nikkei & Japanese Abroad and Association Pan-American Nikkei in Honolulu Hawaii.

- 2024

a) A new set of bylaws was implemented.

b) Stronger cooperation between the Pan American Nikkei Association and the Association of Nikkei and Japanese Abroad. (Source: Nikkeijintaikai 10/17/2024): We welcome the growing friendship in recent years between the Pan American Nikkei Association (PANA) which are affiliated with Nikkei organizations in 13 countries in North and Latin America and the Association of Nikkei and Japanese Abroad (ANJA). With the cooperation of PANA, the 59th Convention of Nikkei and Japanese Abroad in 2018 declared June 20 as "International Day of Nikkei" and since then, commemorative events are held on that day. Both PANA and ANJA emphasize the importance of promoting the development and collaboration of the Nikkei community, upholding its cultural values, and encouraging the participation of the younger generation. We look forward to continued expansion and deepening of our cooperative relationship through the dissemination of information and the exchange and participation of the younger generation in our activities.

== Sources ==
- Kasamatsu, Emi. (2005). Historia de la Asociación Panamericana Nikkei: Presencia e inmigración japonesas en las Américas. Asunción: Servilibro. ISBN 978-99925-921-4-4; OCLC 68741080
- Kikumura-Yano, Akemi and Daniel K. Inouye. (2002). Encyclopedia of Japanese Descendants in the Americas: An Illustrated History of the Nikkei.. Walnut Creek, California: Rowman Altamira. ISBN 978-0-7591-0149-4; OCLC 48965106
- Masterson, Daniel M. and Sayaka Funada-Classen. (2003). The Japanese in Latin America. Urbana: University of Illinois Press. ISBN 978-0-252-07144-7
