= Issei =

First generation of Japanese people who immigrated to the Americas

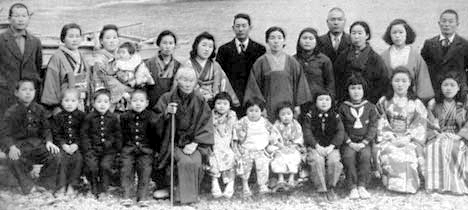
The first Japanese immigrants arrived in Brazil aboard the Kassato Maru in 1908. They referred to themselves as issei and became known as Nipo-Brasileiros.

Issei (一世, "first generation") are Japanese immigrants to countries in North and South America, Australia, or any other country outside of Japan. The term is used mostly by ethnic Japanese. Issei are born in Japan; their children born in the new country are nisei (ni, "two", plus sei, "generation"); and their grandchildren are sansei (san, "three", plus sei, "generation").

The character and uniqueness of the issei is recognized in their social history.

== History ==
The earliest organized group of Japanese emigrants settled in Mexico in 1897. In the 21st century, the four largest populations of diaspora Japanese and descendants of Japanese immigrants in the Western Hemisphere live in Brazil, the United States, Canada, and Peru.

=== Brazilian issei ===
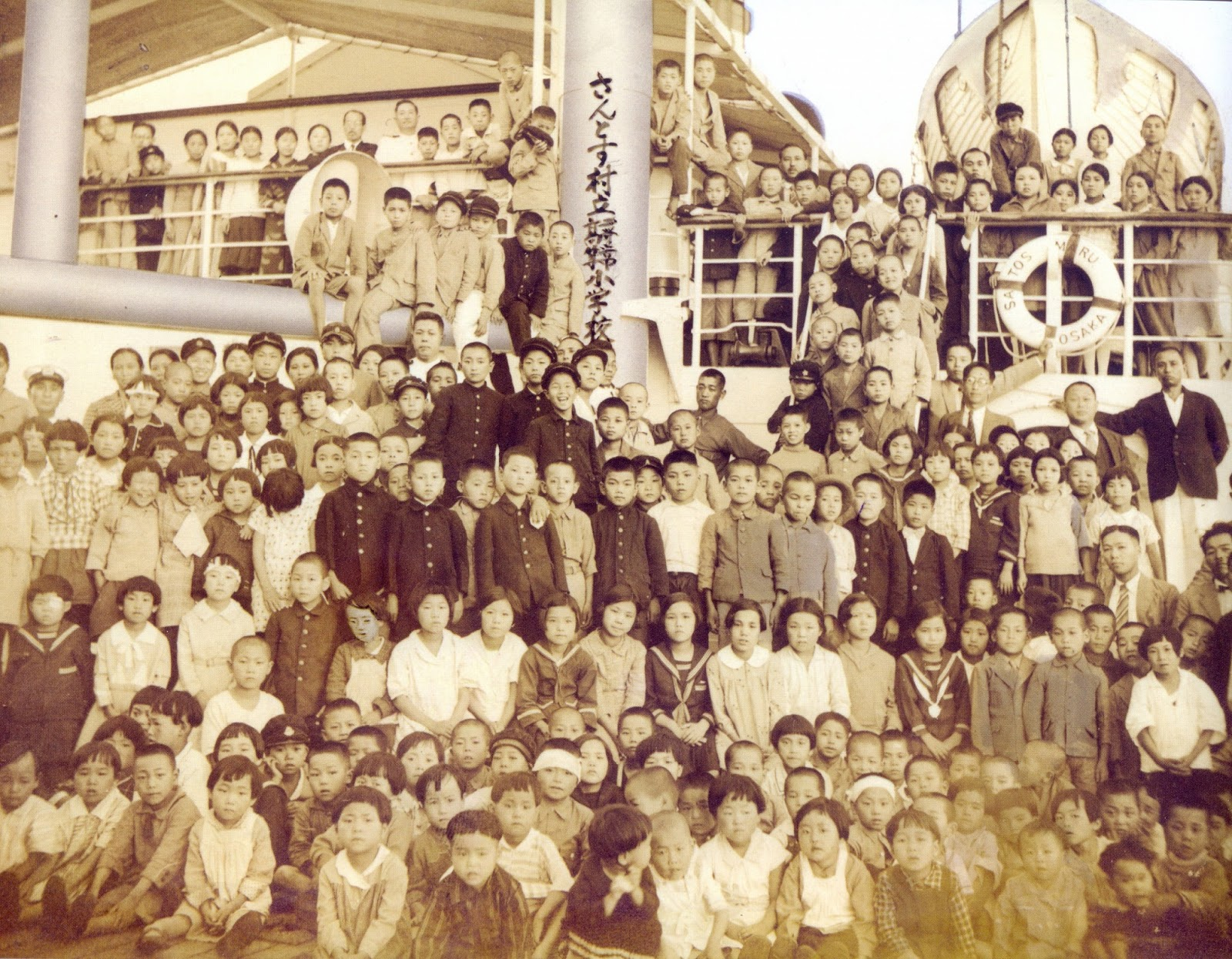
Japanese immigrants in Brazil in the 1930s

Brazil is home to the largest ethnic Japanese population outside Japan, numbering an estimated more than 1.5 million (including those of mixed-race or mixed-ethnicity), more than that of the 1.2 million in the United States. The issei Japanese Brazilians are an important part of Asian ethnic minorities in Brazil.

=== American issei ===
The first members of the issei emigrated not directly to the mainland United States, but to Hawaii. These emigrants—the first of whom arrived on board the steamship City of Tokio in February 1885—were common laborers escaping hard times in Japan to work in Hawai'i. Their immigration was subsidized by the Hawaiian government, as cheap labor was needed for important commodity crops, especially its sugar plantations. Numerous Japanese eventually settled in Hawaii.

Emigration of Japanese directly to the mainland began in 1885, when "student-laborers" landed on the West Coast of the United States. The earliest of these emigrated to San Francisco. Their numbers continually increased in the late 1880s and early 1890s. Their purpose in moving to America was to gain advanced knowledge and experience to develop the modern society at home. Both students and laborers were attracted by the image of the United States as a country that welcomed foreigners. When they first arrived in the U.S., they had not intended to live there permanently, but rather to learn from Americans and to take that knowledge back home. While they encountered discrimination, they also made opportunities, and many settled in California, and later in Washington and Oregon as well as Alaska (to a lesser degree).

=== Canadian issei ===
Within Japanese-Canadian communities across Canada, like their American counterparts, three distinct subgroups developed, each with different socio-cultural referents, generational identity, and wartime experiences. The narrative of issei Japanese-Canadians include post-Pearl Harbor experiences of uprooting, incarceration, and dispersal of the pre-war Japanese-Canadian communities.

=== Peruvian issei ===
Among the approximately 100,000 (2021) Peruvians of Japanese descent living in Peru, the issei Japanese Peruvians comprise a small number.

== Cultural profile ==
=== Generations ===
Japanese-Americans and Japanese-Canadians have specific names for each of their generations in North America. These are formed by combining one of the Japanese numbers corresponding to the generation with the Japanese word for generation (世, sei). The Japanese-American and Japanese-Canadian communities have themselves distinguished their members with terms like issei, nisei, and sansei, which describe the first, second and third generation of immigrants. The fourth generation is called yonsei (四世) and the fifth is called gosei (五世).

Issei (一世, "first generation") is a Japanese-language term used by ethnic Japanese in countries in North America and South America to specify the Japanese people who were the first generation to immigrate there.

Originally, as mentioned above, these words were themselves common nouns in Japan referred to generations or reigns. So they are also still used in Japanese terms for personal names, such as Erizabesu Nisei means Queen Elizabeth II. Within the ethnic Japanese immigrant community they had come to characterize their own generations.

The issei, nisei, and sansei generations reflect distinctly different attitudes to authority, gender, involvement with non-Japanese, religious belief and practice, and other matters. The age when individuals faced the wartime evacuation and internment during World War II has been found to be the most significant factor that explains such variations in attitudes and behaviour patterns.

The term nikkei (日系) encompasses all of the world's Japanese immigrants across generations. The collective memory of the issei and older nisei was an image of Meiji Japan from 1870 through 1911. Newer immigrants carry very different memories of more recent Japan. These differing attitudes, social values and associations with Japan were often incompatible with each other. The significant differences in post-war experiences and opportunities did nothing to mitigate the gaps which separated generational perspectives.

Generation	Cohort description
Issei (一世)	The generation of people born in Japan who later immigrated to another country.
Nisei (二世)	The generation of people born in North America, Latin America, Australia, Hawaii, or any country outside Japan either to at least one issei or one non-immigrant Japanese parent.
Sansei (三世)	The generation of people born to at least one nisei parent.
Yonsei (四世)	The generation of people born to at least one sansei parent.
Gosei (五世)	The generation of people born to at least one yonsei parent.

In North America, since the redress victory in 1988, a significant evolutionary change has occurred. The nisei, their parents and their children are changing the way they look at themselves and their pattern of accommodation to the non-Japanese majority.

There are just over one hundred thousand British Japanese, mostly in London. Unlike other Nikkei communities in the world, these Britons do not identify themselves in such generational terms as issei, nisei, or sansei.

==== Issei ====
The first generation of immigrants, born in Japan before emigrating, is called Issei (一世). In the 1930s, the term Issei came into common use, replacing the term "immigrant" (ijusha). This new term illustrated a changed way of looking at themselves. The term Issei represented the idea of beginning, a psychological transformation relating to being settled, having a distinctive community, and the idea of belonging to the new country.

Issei settled in close ethnic communities, and therefore did not learn English. They endured great economic and social losses during the early years of World War II, and they were unable to rebuild their lost businesses and savings. The external circumstances tended to reinforce the pattern of Issei being predominantly friends with other Issei.

Unlike their children, they tend to rely primarily on Japanese-language media (newspapers, television, movies), and in some senses, they tend to think of themselves as more Japanese than Canadian or American.

==== Issei women ====
Issei women's lives were somewhat similar, despite differences in context, because they were structured within interlocking webs of patriarchal relationships, and that consistent subordination was experienced both as oppressive and as a source of happiness. The Issei women lived lives of transition which were affected by three common factors: the dominant ideology of late Meiji Japan, which advanced the economic objectives of the Japanese state; the patriarchal traditions of the agricultural village, which arose partly as a form of adjustment to national objectives and the adjustment to changes imposed by modernization; and the constraints which arose within a Canadian or American society dominated by racist ideology. Substantive evidence of the working lives of Issei women is very difficult to find, partly for lack of data and partly because the data that do exist are influenced by their implicit ideological definition of women. In Hawai‘i, Issei women worked as washerwomen, midwives, and barbers, providing essential services to the growing immigrant population. Issei women were instrumental in fostering social cohesion and preserving Japanese culture through the establishment of community organizations. Shizue Iwatsuki founded the Japanese Women’s Society in Hood River, Oregon, which provided a vital social network for Japanese immigrant women while ensuring the continuation of cultural traditions.

Issei women divided their time between working and keeping house. Many described their lives as a constant cycle of labor, balancing agricultural work with domestic responsibilities. They frequently referred to their husbands as "Meiji men," describing them as embodying the patriarchal ideals of late Meiji Japan. These men often avoided household or childcare duties, leaving Issei women to shoulder most of the physical and emotional labor.

==== Aging ====
The kanreki (還暦), a traditional, pre-modern Japanese rite of passage to old age at 60, was sometimes celebrated by the Issei and is now being celebrated by increasing numbers of Nisei. Rituals are enactments of shared meanings, norms, and values; and this Japanese rite of passage highlights a collective response among the Nisei to the conventional dilemmas of growing older.

Japanese-American photographer Mary Koga documented elderly first generation immigrants in her Portrait of the Issei in Illinois, taken between 1986 and 1989.

== History ==
The experience of emigrants is inevitably affected by a range of factors directly related to the Japanese society they left behind. As immigrants, the conflicts between the old country and the new played out in unique ways for each individual, and yet common elements do begin to appear in the history of the Japanese Canadian and Japanese American communities.

=== Emigrants from Japan ===
Japan was a closed country for more than two centuries, 1636 to 1853, since military rulers from the Tokugawa family wanted to keep foreigners away from Japanese society. The only exceptions were Chinese and some Dutch, but even they were discouraged from associating with Japanese citizens. Also, it was strictly prohibited by law for ordinary Japanese citizens to go abroad. Change came around the early 19th century when the visit of an American fleet commanded by Commodore Perry caused the new Japanese government to replace the Tokugawa system of economics and politics during the Meiji era to open its door to trade and contact with the outside world.

After 1866, the new Japanese government decided to send students and laborers to the U.S. to bring back the knowledge and experience necessary for the nation to grow strong.

After 1884, emigration of working classes was permitted; and the first issei began to arrive in North and South America soon after. For example, in 1890, only 25 Issei lived in Oregon. By 1891, 1,000 Japanese lived in Oregon. In 1900, 2,051 Japanese had come to live in Oregon. By 1915, Japanese men with savings of $800 were considered eligible to summon wives from Japan.

=== Immigrants in the United States ===
Few Japanese workers came to North America intending to become immigrants. Initially, most of them came with vague plans for gaining new experiences and for making some money before returning to homes in Japan. This group of workers was overwhelmingly male. Many Issei arrived as laborers. They worked in employment sectors such as agriculture, mining, and railroad construction.

The Issei were born in Japan, and their cultural perspective was primarily Japanese; but they were in America by choice. Despite a certain nostalgia for the old country, they had created homes in a country far from Japan. If they had not been prohibited from becoming citizens, many would have become citizens of the United States.

In 1913, California's Alien Land Law prohibited non-citizens from owning land in the state, and several other states soon after passed their own restrictive alien land laws. This included the Issei, Japanese residents born in Japan, but not their children, the Nisei, who were born in United States or Hawaii, and who therefore were American citizens by birth. Many of the Issei responded to the law by transferring title to their land to their Nisei children.

=== Americans' first impression of Issei ===
Americans generally viewed the Issei as a crude, ill-educated lot. Possible reasons for this may be the fact that most Japanese were forced to work in menial jobs in the U.S., such as farming. Many Issei were in fact better educated than either the Japanese or American public. Sixty percent had completed middle school, and 21 percent were high school graduates.

Whether Christians, Buddhists, or nonbelievers, the Issei almost never caused trouble in the civil authority. The arrest rate for the Issei from 1902 to the 1960s was relatively lower than for any other major ethnic group in California. The only exceptions were that some young Issei committed crimes relating to gambling and prostitution, which stemmed from different cultural morals in Japan.

=== Racial segregation and immigration law ===
The post-1900 cause to renew the Chinese Exclusion Act became generalized protests against all Asian immigrants, including the Issei. Since Chinese immigration to the U.S. was largely limited, hostility fell on the Issei. American labor organizations took an initiative in spreading anti-Japanese sentiment. White Americans wanted to exclude them since they did not want any Asians to take their jobs away. As a result, they formed the Asiatic Exclusion League that viewed Japanese and Chinese as a threat of American workers. The protest of the league involved picketing and beatings of the Issei. In October 1906, amid this anti-Japanese milieu, the San Francisco School Board, carrying out a campaign promise of the mayor, ordered all Japanese and Korean pupils to join the Chinese students at a segregated school. The Issei were displeased with the situation and some reported to Japanese newspapers. This caused the Japanese government to protest against the former president, Theodore Roosevelt, and as a result, they signed the Gentlemen's Agreement of 1907. This agreement led the period of settling and family building to come.

By 1911, almost half of the Japanese immigrants were women who landed in the U.S. to reunite with their husbands. After the Gentleman's agreement, a number of Nisei, the second-generation Japanese, were born in California. Yet, it did not stop some white Americans from segregating Japanese immigrants. The Issei were a role model of American citizens by being hardworking, law-abiding, devoted to family and the community. However, some Americans did not want to admit the virtues of the Issei.

The Immigration Act of 1924 represented the Issei's failed struggle against the segregation. The experiences of the Issei extend from well before the period before 1 July 1924, when the Japanese Exclusion Act came into effect.

The Issei, however, were very good at enhancing rice farming on "unusable" land. Japanese Californian farmers made rice a major crop of the state. The largest Issei community settled around Vacaville, California, near San Francisco.

=== Internment ===
When the Canadian and American governments interned West Coast Japanese in 1942, neither distinguished between those who were citizens (Nisei) and their non-citizen parents (Issei). When the apology and redress for injustices were enacted by the American Congress and the Canadian Parliament in 1988, most of the Issei were dead, or too old for it to make any significant difference in lives that had been disrupted.

== Notable individuals ==
The number of issei who have earned some degree of public recognition has continued to increase over time; but the quiet lives of those whose names are known only to family and friends are no less important in understanding the broader narrative of the nikkei. Although the names highlighted here are over-represented by issei from North America, the Latin American member countries of the Pan American Nikkei Association (PANA) include Argentina, Bolivia, Brazil, Chile, Colombia, Mexico, Paraguay, Peru and Uruguay, in addition to the English-speaking United States and Canada.

- Kan'ichi Asakawa (1873–1948), academic, author, peace advocate, historian and librarian
- Norio Azuma (1928–2004), artist
- Jun Fujita (1888–1963), an early 20th century photographer
- Miki Gorman (1935–2015), a two-time winner of both the Boston and New York marathons
- Midori Gotō (1971– ), a violinist and recipient of the Avery Fisher Prize
- Makoto Hagiwara (1854–1925), a landscape designer often credited with having invented the fortune cookie
- Sessue Hayakawa (1889–1973), an Academy Award-nominated actor
- Mazie Hirono (1947– ), an American politician
- Shizuko Hoshi, Shin-issei (Japanese born), actress
- Rena Inoue (1976– ), a two-time U.S. National Champion pair skater
- Shin Koyamada (1982– ), a Hollywood film actor, philanthropist, entrepreneur and US martial arts champion
- Fujitaro Kubota (1879–1973), an American gardener and philanthropist
- Yoko Ono Lennon (1933– ) artist and musician.
- George Masa (1881–1933), activist in creation of Great Smoky Mountains National Park
- Hikaru Nakamura (1987– ), an American chess Grandmaster and five time United States Chess Champion.
- Yoichiro Nambu (1921–2015), a physicist and 2008 Nobel Laureate
- Masi Oka (1974– ), an Emmy and Golden Globe Award nominated American actor
- George Shima (1864–1926), the first Japanese American millionaire.
- Cary-Hiroyuki Tagawa (1950–2025), Shin-issei (Japanese born), actor
- Jōkichi Takamine (1854–1922), a Japanese chemist
- Tamlyn Tomita, actress; Sansei on father's side and mother is Japanese/Filipina
- Miyoshi Umeki, (May 8, 1929 – August 28, 2007) was a Japanese-American singer and actress. Umeki was a Tony Award- and Golden Globe-nominated actress and the first East Asian-American woman to win an Academy Award for acting from the 1958 film, Sayonara as well as Mei Li in the Broadway musical and 1961 MGM film Flower Drum Song, and Mrs. Livingston in the television series The Courtship of Eddie's Father. She was a shin Issei, or post-1945 immigrant from Japan.
- Takuji Yamashita (1874–1959), an early civil-rights campaigner

== See also ==
- Asian American
- Asian Canadian
- Hyphenated American
- Internment of Japanese Americans
- Japanese American Citizens League
- Japanese American National Library
- Japanese American National Museum
- Japanese Canadian
- Japanese Brazilian
- Japanese community in the United Kingdom
- Japanese people
- List of Japanese Americans
- Model minority
- Nisei Baseball Research Project
- Pacific Movement of the Eastern World
- Gila River War Relocation Center
- Granada War Relocation Center
- Heart Mountain War Relocation Center
- Jerome War Relocation Center
- Manzanar National Historic Site
- Minidoka National Historic Site
- Poston War Relocation Center
- Rohwer War Relocation Center
- Topaz War Relocation Center
- Tule Lake War Relocation Center
