= Japan–Latin America relations =

International relations

Latin America

Japan

Japan–Latin America relations are relations between Japan and the countries of Latin America. Although relations span a period no later than the 19th century to the present, in recent decades, Japanese popular culture has played a major role in Latin America.

== Overview ==
In Latin America, Japan has a long history of diplomatic relations with countries like Peru and Brazil. There has been a large ethnic Japanese presence in Latin America since the late 1800s. In the past decade, two factors have driven a deepening of these trans-Pacific relationships: first, at the turn of the century, Japan shifted its foreign policy from its traditional emphasis on multilateral concepts to one emphasizing regionalism in order to shore up weakened competitiveness as compared to other international actors. Second, Latin American countries, especially South American ones, were experiencing high rates of economic growth and political stability, making the region more attractive to foreign investors.

== Culture ==
Japanese migrants brought Japanese culture to Latin America, which include anime, J-pop, video games, language education, and food, all which have had a significant impact on young Latin American populations. They also introduced intensive farming systems and Asian crops and the concept of agricultural cooperatives.

== Relations with Latin American countries ==
Country	Formal relations began	Notes	Photo
Argentina	3 February 1898	See Argentina–Japan relations Argentine–Japanese relations were established in the late 19th century. The history of Japanese-Argentinian relations was influenced to a large extent by Argentina being a country of immigration. The first known Japanese to immigrate to Argentina arrived by boat in 1886. Argentina today has about 30,000 Japanese immigrants. Diplomatic relations between Japan and Argentina were raised to Embassy level in 1940 but relations were severed in 1944. On March 27, 1945, the Argentinian government entered World War II on the Allied side and declared war on the Japanese Empire. Diplomatic relations were restored by the signing of the San Francisco Peace Treaty in 1952. Argentine president Arturo Frondizi visited Japan in 1960, and bilateral trade and Japanese investment into Argentina have increased in importance.: Argentina has an embassy in Tokyo.; Japan has an embassy in Buenos Aires.	
Bolivia	3 April 1914	See Bolivia–Japan relations: Bolivia has an embassy in Tokyo.; Japan has an embassy in La Paz and a consulate office in Santa Cruz de la Sierra.	
Brazil	5 November 1895	See Brazil–Japan relations Brazil–Japan relations refers to the bilateral relationship of Brazil and Japan. Japan first established diplomatic relations with Brazil in 1895. After World War II, Japan used foreign aid to promote its trade with Brazil.: Brazil has an embassy in Tokyo and consulates-general in Hamamatsu and Nagoya.; Japan has an embassy in Brasília and consulates-general in Belém, Curitiba, Manaus, Recife, Rio de Janeiro, São Paulo and in Porto Alegre.	
Chile	25 September 1897	See Chile–Japan relations: Chile has an embassy in Tokyo.; Japan has an embassy in Santiago.	
Colombia	25 May 1908	See Colombia–Japan relations Colombia–Japan relations refers to the diplomatic relations between the Republic of Colombia and Japan. The relationship was officially established in 1908, but interrupted between 1942 and 1954 with the surge of World War II. Embassy status was regained in 1957. Relations are mostly based on commercial trade, cultural exchanges and technological and philanthropic aid.: Colombia has an embassy in Tokyo.; Japan has an embassy in Bogotá.	
Costa Rica	February 1935	See Costa Rica–Japan relations: Costa Rica has an embassy in Tokyo.; Japan has an embassy in San José.	
Cuba	21 December 1929	See Cuba–Japan relations: Cuba has an embassy in Tokyo.; Japan has an embassy in Havana.	
Dominican Republic	November 1934	See Dominican Republic–Japan relations: Dominican Republic has an embassy in Tokyo.; Japan has an embassy in Santo Domingo.	
Ecuador	26 August 1918	See Ecuador–Japan relations: Ecuador has an embassy in Tokyo.; Japan has an embassy in Quito.	
El Salvador	15 February 1935	See El Salvador–Japan relations: El Salvador has an embassy in Tokyo.; Japan has an embassy in San Salvador.	
Guatemala	20 February 1935	See Guatemala–Japan relations: Guatemala has an embassy in Tokyo.; Japan has an embassy in Guatemala City.	
Honduras	23 February 1935	See Honduras–Japan relations: Honduras has an embassy in Tokyo.; Japan has an embassy in Tegucigalpa.	
Mexico	30 November 1888	See Japan–Mexico relations: Japan has an embassy in Mexico City and a consulate-general in León.; Mexico has an embassy in Tokyo.	
Nicaragua	20 February 1935	See Japan–Nicaragua relations: Japan has an embassy in Managua.; Nicaragua has an embassy in Tokyo.	
Panama	7 January 1904	See Japan–Panama relations: Japan has an embassy in Panama City.; Panama has an embassy in Tokyo.	
Paraguay	17 November 1919	See Japan–Paraguay relations Japan–Paraguay relations refers to the bilateral relationship of Paraguay and Japan. Japan first established diplomatic relations with Paraguay in 1919.: Japan has an embassy in Asunción.; Paraguay has an embassy in Tokyo.	
Peru	21 August 1873	See Japan–Peru relations: Japan has an embassy in Lima.; Peru has an embassy in Tokyo.	
Uruguay	24 September 1921	See Japan–Uruguay relations Japan–Uruguay relations refers to the bilateral relationship of Uruguay and Japan. Japan first established diplomatic relations with Uruguay in 1921.: Japan has an embassy in Montevideo.; Uruguay has an embassy in Tokyo.	
Venezuela	19 August 1938	See Japan–Venezuela relations Japan–Venezuela relations are foreign relations between Japan and Venezuela. Formal diplomatic relations between the countries were established in August 1938. Venezuela, however, broke off diplomatic ties with Japan in December 1941. In 1999, Venezuelan President Hugo Chavez made a three-day trip to Japan. He made another two-day trip in 2009, during which he met Prime Minister Taro Aso. During the trip, they agreed to cooperate on oil and gas developments and form a committee to study financing development and exploration. Japan and Venezuela signed a dozen other accords as part of Chavez’s visit.: Japan has an embassy in Caracas.; Venezuela has an embassy in Tokyo.	

== See also ==
- Foreign relations of Japan
- Forum of East Asia–Latin America Cooperation
