= Hitachi-no-miya =

Royal Japanese title or miyake

Hitachi-no-miya 常陸宮
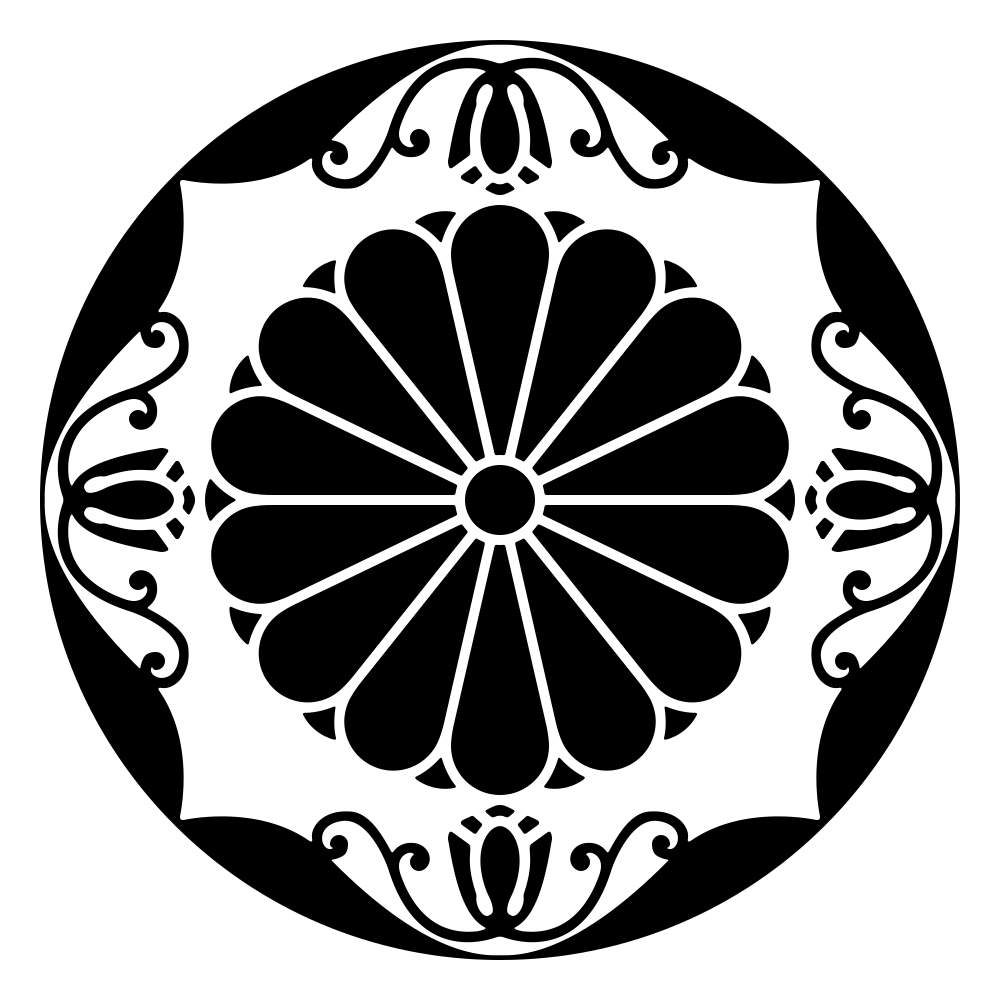
- Home province: Tokyo
- Parent house: Imperial House of Japan
- Titles: Prince Hitachi; Princess Hitachi
- Founder: Masahito, Prince Hitachi
- Current head: Masahito, Prince Hitachi
- Founding year: 1964

The Hitachi-no-miya is a branch of the Japanese imperial family.

The Hitachi-no-miya was established on September 30th, 1964, when Emperor Shōwa granted Prince Masahito permission to start a new branch of the Imperial Family upon the occasion of his marriage to Hanako Tsugaru.

The title of Prince Hitachi was derived from Hitachi Province, a province where Imperial Princes were customarily appointed to the position of provincial governor.

Members

Name	Gender	Date of Birth	Age	Relation	Place in Line of Succession
Masahito, Prince Hitachi	Male	November 28, 1935	90	Second son of Emperor Shōwa	3rd
Hanako, Princess Hitachi	Female	July 19, 1940	85	Consort of Prince Masahito	

== Genealogy ==
124th Emperor of Japan; Emperor Shōwa
125th Emperor of Japan; Emperor Akihito	1st Prince Hitachi; Prince Masahito	Princess Hanako

== Residence ==
Since the establishment of the Hitachi household, they have resided at Tokiwamatsu Palace, in Higashi, Shibuya, Tokyo. As of 2026, the Hitachi branch is the only branch of the Imperial Family who do not reside on the grounds of the Akasaka Imperial Estate.
