= Guatemala–Japan relations =

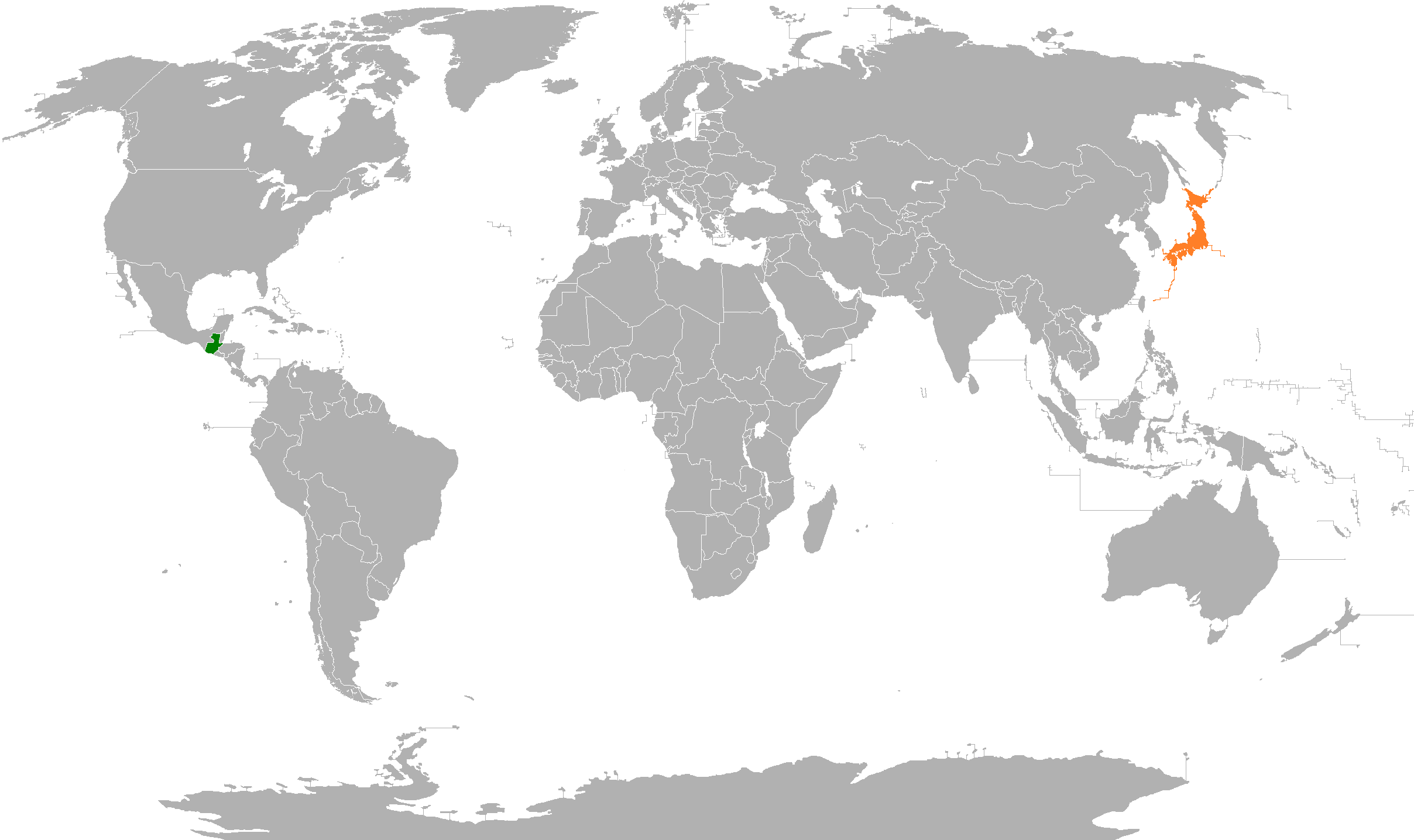
- Guatemala: Japan

Guatemala–Japan relations are the bilateral relations between Japan and Guatemala. The two countries established diplomatic relations in 1933. Guatemala has an embassy in Tokyo. Japan has an embassy in Guatemala City.

== History ==
On February 20, 1935, the Government of Japan appointed Mr. Yoshiatsu Hori, Minister of the Embassy of Japan in Mexico, concurrent for Guatemala. On June 28 of that year, Mr. Hori presented his Credentials to the President of Guatemala, General Jorge Ubico. Six years after establishing diplomatic relations, on December 8, 1941, with the beginning of World War II and the Japanese attack on Pearl Harbor, diplomatic relations between Japan and Guatemala were temporarily interrupted. Guatemala declared war on Japan in 1941, and closed bilateral relations. Reestablished on October 16, 1954, after the signing of the Treaty of San Francisco, on September 23, 1954.

On July 1, 1955, the Government of Japan appointed the Minister of the Embassy of Japan in Mexico as Concurrent Minister for Guatemala. On November 21, 1964, the Government of Guatemala opened its Embassy in Japan. On January 27, 1967, the Government of Japan opened its Embassy in Guatemala.

In September 1987, the Minister of Foreign Affairs of Japan, Tadashi Kuranari, visited Guatemala and signed with the Guatemalan Foreign Minister, Alfonso Cabrera, the Agreement for the Sending of Young Volunteers from Japan Abroad to Guatemala. In November 1990, the Guatemalan Foreign Minister, Ariel Rivera, visited Japan on the occasion of the Enthronement Ceremony of SMI Emperor Akihito and Empress Michiko.

On 14 and 15 September 1997, at the invitation of Álvaro Arzú, Their Imperial Highnesses Prince Masahito and Prince Hanako of Hitachi paid an official visit to Guatemala, marking the first visit to Central America by members of the Imperial House of Japan. Their Imperial Highnesses met with Arzú and conveyed a message of congratulations to the Government and People of Guatemala on the signing of the Peace Accords and also expressed the willingness of the Government and People of Japan to increase their assistance to Guatemala following the signing of the Agreements. In May 2001, Alfonso Portillo and Evelyn Morataya de Portillo visited Japan.

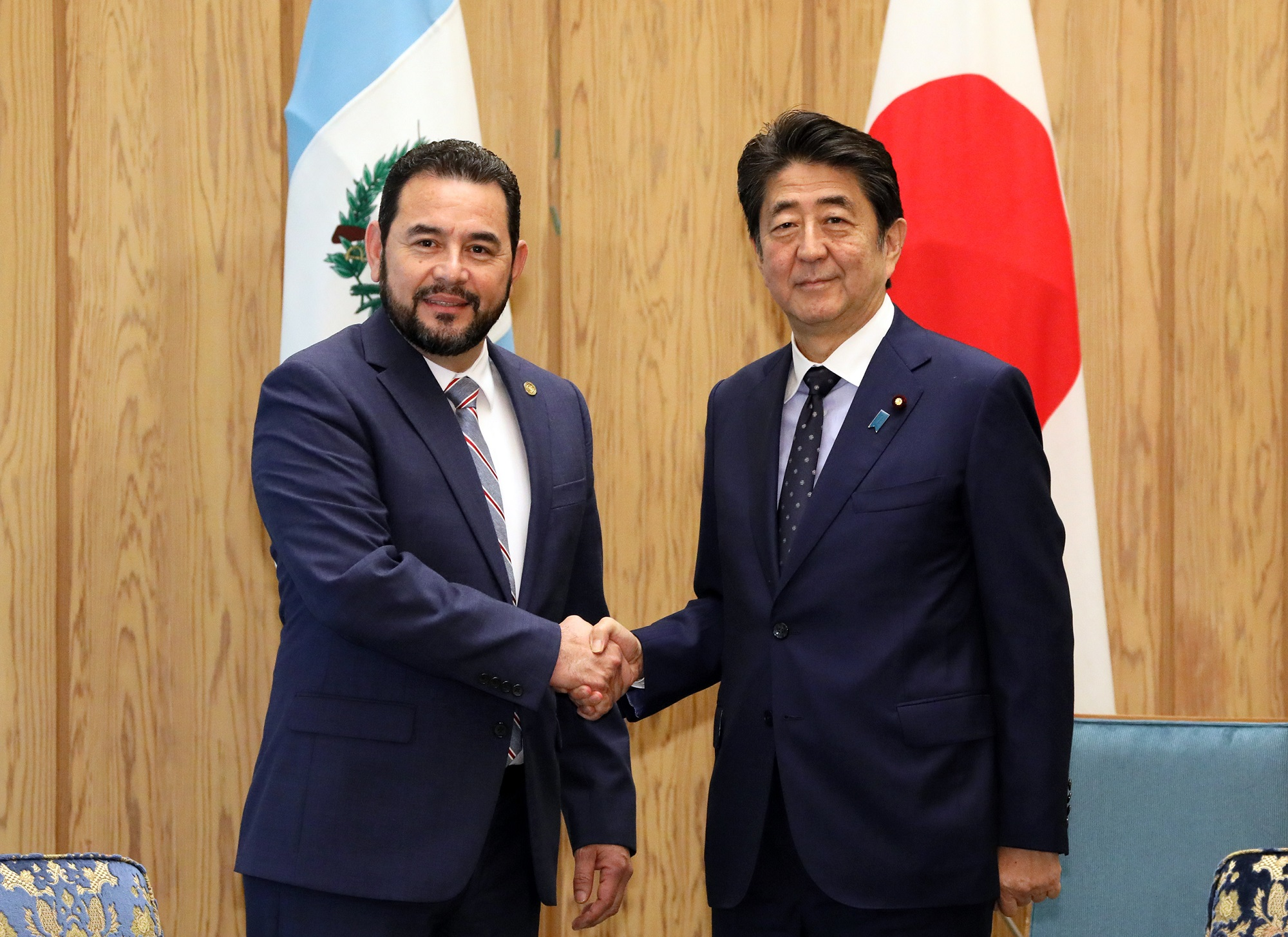
Japanese Prime Minister Shinzō Abe with Guatemalan President Jimmy Morales during the enthronement of Emperor Naruhito.

In 2010, Álvaro Colom visited Japan. On 1 October 2014, Their Imperial Highnesses Princes Akishino, Fumihito and Kiko visited Guatemala and visited the Presidential House, where they dined with the President, Otto Pérez Molina, and his wife, Rosa Leal de Pérez. They also visited the archaeological site of Tikal and the colonial city of Antigua Guatemala.

As of 2017, Japan had 600 collaborators in its embassy in Guatemala. Japan is one of the five main investors in Guatemala and has provided important humanitarian aid to the country.

== High-level visits ==
High level visits from Japan to Guatemala

- Chancellor Tadashi Kuranari (1987)
- Hitachi princes Masahito and Hanako
- Princes Akishino, Fumihito and Kiko (2014)
- Minister of State Masahisa Sato (2019)
- Chancellor Toshimitsu Motegi (2021)

High level visits from Guatemala to Japan

- Foreign Minister Ariel Rivera (1990)
- President Alfonso Portillo and First Lady Evelyn Morataya (2001)
- President Alvaro Colom (2010)
- President Jimmy Morales (2019)

== See also ==
- Foreign relations of Guatemala
- Foreign relations of Japan
