= Japanese Venezuelans =

Japanese Venezuelans Japonés Venezolano
- (Japan) (Venezuela)

Total population
- 1,172

Regions with significant populations
- Caracas, Puerto La Cruz, and Maracaibo.

Languages
- Venezuelan Spanish, Japanese.

Religion
- Roman Catholicism and Buddhism

Related ethnic groups
- Japanese Americans, Japanese Argentines, Japanese Brazilians, Japanese Colombians, Japanese Mexicans, Japanese Paraguayans, Japanese Peruvians, Japanese Uruguayans

Japanese Venezuelans are Venezuelan citizens who have full or partial Japanese ancestry. The first wave of Japanese came to Venezuela in 1931.

== Language ==
Most Japanese Venezuelans only speak Spanish. Only a selected number can speak Japanese, while those with higher education speak English. There are even a number of Japanese Venezuelan schools that offer English language teaching to the recent Japanese residents.

== Religion ==
The majority of Japanese Venezuelans are Roman Catholic Christians, while the rest are Buddhists.

== Notable individuals ==
- Kaori F. Yonekura, filmmaker
- Hanshi Gijin Hiramatsu, martial artist
- Alexander Cabrera Suzuki, baseball player
- Hana Kobayashi, singer
- Félix Nakamura, filmmaker
- Yoshikatsu Yoshida, mathematician
- Henry Zakka, actor

== See also ==
- Japan–Venezuela relations
- Japanese diaspora
- Immigration to Venezuela
