= Japanese Colombians =

Japanese Colombians colombianos japoneses
日系コロンビア人
- (Japan) (Colombia)

Total population
- 1,315 Japanese nationals (2024); c. 2,000 Colombians of Japanese descent

Regions with significant populations
- Bogotá, Barranquilla, Santiago de Cali

Languages
- Spanish, Japanese

Religion
- Buddhism, Roman Catholicism, Shintoism and Tenrikyo

Related ethnic groups
- Japanese diaspora, Japanese Americans, Japanese Argentines, Japanese Brazilians, Japanese Mexicans, Japanese Paraguayans, Japanese Peruvians, Japanese Venezuelans

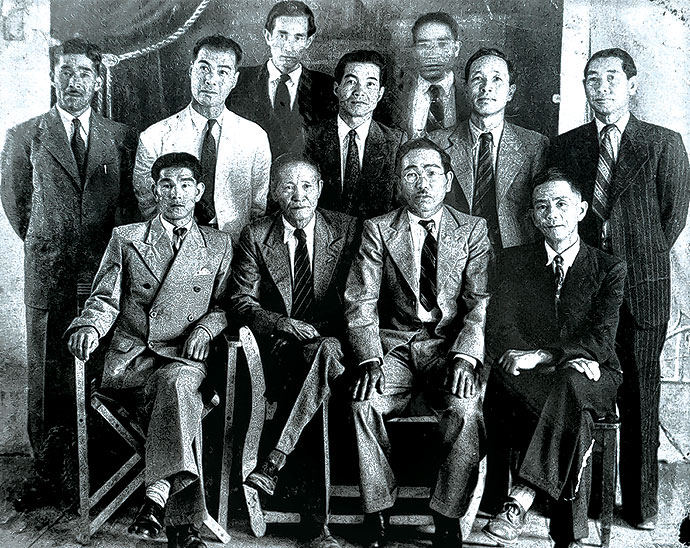
Immigrants from Japan in Palmira (date unknown)

Japanese Colombians are Japanese immigrants and their descendants in Colombia. They have their own culture and organizations. In the early 20th century, Ryôji Noda, consular secretary for both Peru and Brazil and expert advisor to the Japanese government on immigration to South America, was assigned to survey Colombia. On his return to Japan, he presented a report of his tour of Colombia to the Japanese Ministry of Foreign Affairs. This geographical area of Colombia would be occupied by Japanese farmers twenty years later. In 1920, the Farmers Society of Colombia sent a proposal to the Ministries of Foreign Affairs, Agriculture and Trade, drawing the government's attention to the lack of agricultural workers. Following this, Colombian President Rafael Reyes offered to travel and make contracts himself.

Colombia broke diplomatic relations with Japan after the attack on Pearl Harbor. Japanese community meetings in Barranquilla were suspended, as it was forbidden for more than three Japanese people to be gathered at a time. Those living in Valle del Cauca lost their right to roam freely and could only be out under police supervision. Colombia allowed the reinstatement of all officials of the Japanese Legation and of other residents throughout the United States. Thirteen Latin American countries, including Colombia, cooperated with the U.S. in the capture and deportation of citizens of Axis countries. Some immigrants from the El Jagual neighborhood and a few others from Barranquilla were arrested and taken to the Sabaneta Hotel in Fusagasugá. The hotel was converted into an internment camp for Japanese, Italian and German citizens until World War II ended in Europe and Asia. Japanese people were the last to leave detention centers, being released on September 6, 1945, four days after General MacArthur accepted Japan's formal declaration of defeat.

For Japanese residents of Colombia, World War II caused the separation of families and economic struggle. Many people refused to shop at Japanese-owned businesses and Japanese Colombians were met in public with offensive language. They became a vulnerable ethnic minority that was seen as strange and undesirable and they were often subject to mistreatment by the government and by the Colombian people.

== History ==
=== First encounters (1903–1910) ===
According to Toraji Irie’s work on Japanese immigration overseas, when Colombia lost control of the Isthmus of Panama in 1903, it created a sense of worry about the eminent threat of American intervention. In order to protect the country from this, Colombia began soliciting the help of a number of different countries, including Japan. It is inferred that they came from correspondence with a reporter at the time. After diplomatic visits and correspondence between the governments, Antonio Izquierdo visited Japan in 1908. It is presumed that the solicitation of agricultural help from Japan enabled the migration of at least 100,000 workers.

During his visit to Japan, Izquierdo reported that referendum contracts were signed, in which it was expected that only two Japanese commissioners would be sent to study the living and work situation in Colombia, with the objective of promoting the immigration of their natives to said country.

Instead of mentioning the possible number of emigrants, he went on to only mention a single gardener, Tomohiro Kawaguchi, as the first Japanese immigrant to Colombia whose name and trade is known. It is also known that he worked on the embellishment of the San Diego Forest, owned by Antonio Izquierdo, where the Industrial Exhibition of 1910 took place. At the end of the exhibition, the property became known as Independence Park.

Following their Treaty of Friendship, commerce and navigation between the two nations was ratified on 10 December 1908. The Japanese government complied with Izquierdo's request to send a representative to investigate the conditions of the country with a view to future emigration. A newspaper in Tokyo had published a note in which it mentioned that despite having passed a year since the signing of the Treaty and not having yet begun commercial and diplomatic relations, it was expected the future development of emigration would be a success.

Noda, who was secretary consulate in both Peru and Brazil, as well as an expert adviser to the Japanese government on matters of immigration to South America, was entrusted with the mission to survey Colombia. On his return to Japan, he presented a report of his tour of Colombia to the Ministry of Foreign Affairs of his government. Noda refrained from recommending emigration to Colombia for several reasons, among others: the lack of a direct navigation route, which would make the trip very long and expensive; the poor internal communication conditions in Colombia, which would make it difficult to enter and leave the country; the enormous expanse occupied by rugged mountains; the lack of variety of agricultural products, and the periodic floods in the fertile zones of the Magdalena and Cauca rivers. Noda predicted, however, that if emigration to Colombia were to be achieved in the future, he would see the south of the Cauca Valley, especially the part between Santander de Quilichao to the south and Cartago to the north, as a promising region.

This geographical area of Colombia would be the one that would be occupied by Japanese farmers twenty years later. The negative report of Noda coincidentally added to the political crisis that the country was suffering in, due to the abandonment of power of General Rafael Reyes, under whose presidency the treaty had been signed between the two countries, came to light.

=== Immigration to Colombia (1929–1960) ===
The issue of looking for workers in Japan resumed in 1920, when President Reyes of Colombia offered to travel and make contracts himself. This was due to the proposal that the Farmers Society of Colombia sent to the Ministries of Foreign Affairs and Agriculture and Trade, drawing the government's attention to the lack of agricultural workers due to the increase in workers in the railroads.

The Society proposed to the government to go to Japan to negotiate this matter, given that "Japanese immigration seems to be the most appropriate for Colombia". The mission never happened and the matter was closed. In 1926, the Overseas Emigration Company from Fukuoka commissioned two of their employees, Yûzô Takeshima and Tokuhisa Makijima, to make an exploratory trip through Colombia in search of an appropriate place to establish an agricultural colony. Takahiko Wakabayashi, the Japanese consul in Panama, accompanied them on the tour they made, among other places, through Bogotá, Medellín and Barranquilla, the Sabana de Bogotá, the valleys of Cauca and Magdalena.

Their visit to Colombia was made in private, without having any contact with the Ministry of Industries that had the faculty to approve projects for future immigrants, nor did they request vacant lots for future immigrants as they had previously done. Upon his return to Tokyo, the emigration company submitted to the Ministry of Foreign Affairs the reports of the first and a second trip to Colombia to obtain the approval of the emigration project; Once this was obtained, the company, with the advice it received from Japanese emigrants based in Cali and Palmira, bought land in the department of Cauca to establish the agricultural program with the first ten families of emigrants.

Those who went to the Valle del Cauca region made work contracts, without any interference from the emigration company. These contracts ended in 1935 when the commitment of the twenty Japanese families was fulfilled in the agricultural colony.

The last people to leave detention centers were Japanese. On September 6, 1945, four days after General MacArthur accepted the formal declaration of Japan's defeat, they were released. For the Japanese residents of Colombia, the war did not mean anything other than suffering, separation of families, economic difficulties, the closing of the credit and banking transactions, the freezing of their assets and the inclusion of their names in the so-called blacklist, meaning losses of what they had achieved with effort and sacrifice in their work. In some places, people refused to shop at Japanese-owned businesses, and on the streets, they were met with offensive language. In conclusion, it was a hard time that made them realize that they were a vulnerable ethnic minority, they were seen as strange and undesirable, and that they were exposed to mistreatment by the government and the Colombian people at any time. Their reaction, especially in the Valle del Cauca region, was one of union and mutual aid. They began to create associations in which they felt comfortable, safe and united, and remembered their own cultural roots, worthy of pride.

=== Post-World War II ===
In 1960, following the Second World War, 17 Japanese men were hired for the banana zone of Tumaco, but the project was unsuccessful. When the project failed, 14 of them stayed in Colombia. They established ties of work and family union with the former farmers of Corinto, who by then had dispersed in some areas of the Valle del Cauca, thus expanding the number of Japanese farmers in southern Colombia. Other activities such as the cultivation of vegetables, the sale of ice scrapes, administration of grocery stores and bars owned with billiard games completed the activities that assured them an income. The job of a barber, which was quite popular among the Japanese who lived in Panama, had the advantage of being able to learn and work as an assistant with another Japanese to gain experience. It did not require much initial capital and one could work in a company or independently. Simple equipment and furniture were enough. What the trade did require were cleanliness and manual dexterity. The Japanese barbers in Barranquilla acquired a reputation for being clean, careful and gentle. Their fame earned them the nickname of silk hands.

While immigrants on the North Coast excelled in the barbershop trade, those who migrated to the interior of the country excelled in gardening and agriculture.

== Returning to Japan ==
At first, those of Japanese descent living in South America who went back to Japan in search of work, did so through intermediaries. In 1991, in Colombia, a subcontractor who was taking a tour through South American cities looking for workers of Japanese descent, made the initial contact through Colombian-Japanese associations in Cali and Barranquilla. In their first year of recruitment, 40 people signed up to work in Japan, with a larger number of men than women. Initially, these workers traveled alone, and then eventually brought their families that had been left in Colombia, to Japan.

For migrants who did not know the Japanese language or customs, contact with contractor firms was advantageous. Through them, they got loans to finance the trip, they received help in processing their official papers with immigration, they found employment easily and lodging near work. After the initial years of adjusting to the work, and thanks to having already established their own contacts and expanded their personal and work relationships, the Japanese-Colombian immigrants who traveled back to Japan, also known as Nikkei, have become more independent. They did not need to resort to contractor firms to get a new job; rather, they used their family and friend collections.

Nikkei workers continue to play an important role in Japanese society as they help in areas of work where labor is scarce; the privileged visa that has been granted to them allows them to be employed in any type of work. Most Japanese descendants are working in the manufacturing and construction industry or in fish processing. They usually work for a limited time contract and receive their salary according to the hours worked. Some of the Colombian Nikkei, who started like the rest of their colleagues, in hard and heavy jobs of the factories, enjoy positions that are consistent with their professional training. Although more than a decade has passed since the immigration law reform, and the resulting influx of Nikkei workers rose, the basic concerns of immigrants have not changed. They continue to concern the education of children, the lack of social security that would insure them in case of illness or accident, and their inability to earn a pension in the future when they stop working.

=== Colombian Nikkei in Japanese society ===
In terms of education, perhaps the most serious problem arises when children do not have enough knowledge of the Japanese language and their parents can not help them with homework, due to their own ability to communicate in Japanese. As a result of this, many Japanese Colombians drop out during elementary school. Many children of immigrants do not receive adequate education in Japan or in the country of origin, with few completing higher education studies.

The lack of social security and retirement is a problem for the aging population of Colombian Nikkei. This is partly due to companies trying to avoid the obligatory payment for their employees, offering them short-term or hourly contracts. Immigrants themselves, who feel uncertain about when they will return to their country, do not want to contribute with the social security quota.

To date, an association has been formed for the Nikkei of Brazil and Peru.

== Japanese-Colombian demographic ==
Since the revision of the immigration law in 1989, the flow of people from Latin American countries increased very rapidly in a short time. While in 1984 the population of Latin Americans living in Japan reached only 4,260 people, in 1990 it increased to 72,673 and in 1995 it had tripled to 223,812. In 1984 were 232 Colombians, but increased by 425 by 1990 and in 1995 the number reached 1,367 people.

These figures do not discriminate against the Nikkei population of those who do not have Japanese ancestry. It is estimated that the Nikkei Latin American population is at 240,000 people living in Japan. In the case of Colombia, the number is approximately 300 people. It is estimated that the Colombian Nikkei has an estimated population of 1,700 inhabitants.

== Culture ==
=== Film ===
There are films that portray the romantic aspect of Japanese diaspora in Colombia, such as the film El Sueño del Paraíso, shot in 2006 and shown in 2007, where the director Carlos Palau recreated the history of that community and his approach to the country through a novel "María" written by Jorge Isaacs.

It portrays the difficult transition, which takes place during the period of the war in the Pacific, after which Colombia, as an allied government of the United States, decided to separate Italian, German, and Japanese people from society, apart from making them outcasts.

=== Karate ===
In 1971, with the arrival of Shihan Hiroshi Taninokuchi to Colombia, the Colombian Association of Karate (ASCOK) was founded with the introduction of the Shotokan style. The objective was to organize and promote the practice of Karate-Do at a national level and to gather participants from all over the country.

== See also ==
- Colombia–Japan relations
- Japanese diaspora
- Immigration to Colombia
