= Honduras–Japan relations =

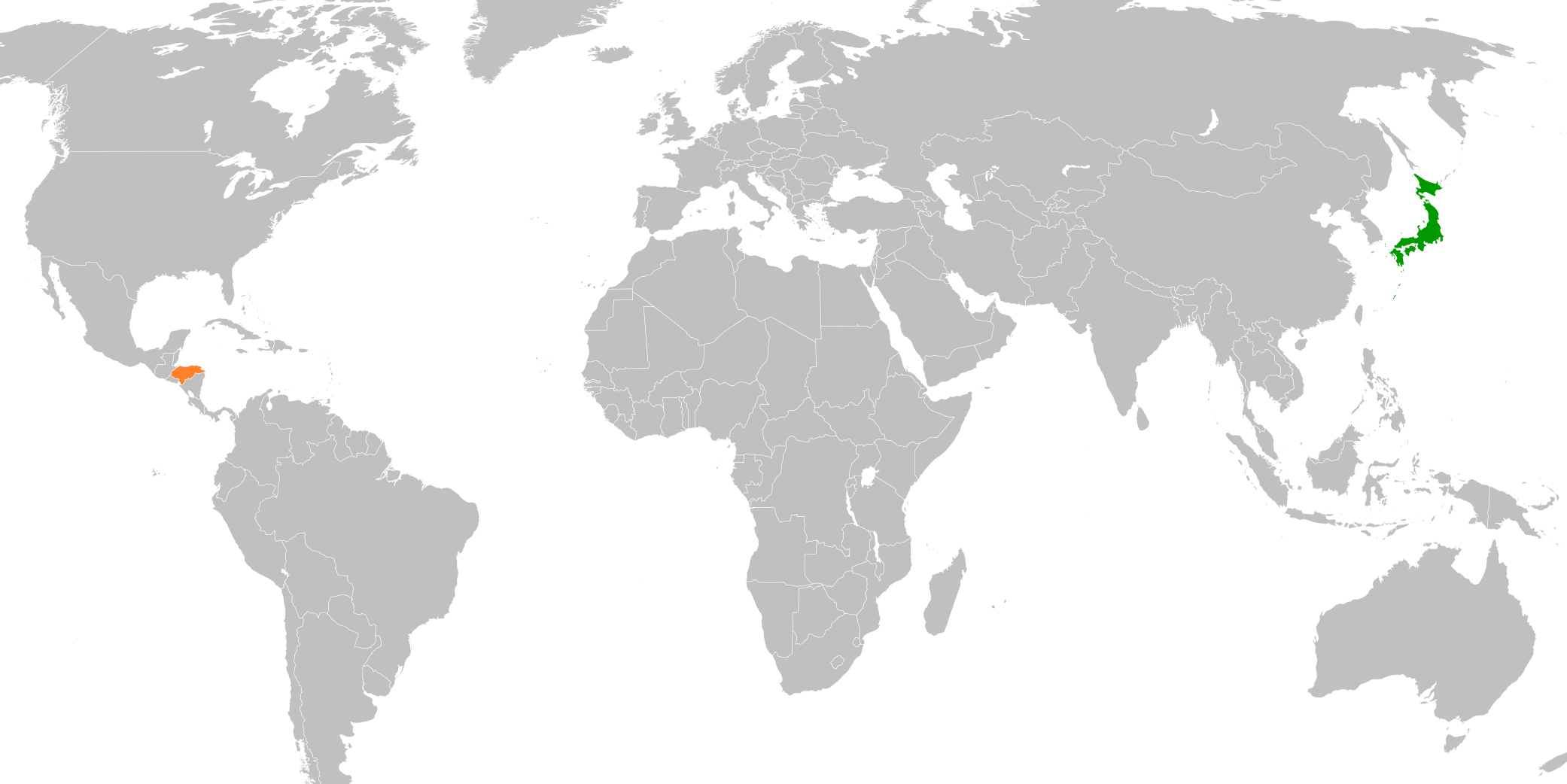

- Japan: Honduras

Honduras–Japan relations refer to bilateral relations between the Republic of Honduras and the State of Japan. Although economic activities between Honduras and Japan had already existed in previous decades, it was not until 1935 that diplomatic relations between the two nations were formalized. Japan has an embassy in Tegucigalpa. Honduras has an embassy in Tokyo.

== History ==
=== Background ===
Honduras began to open up to the world in the mid-19th century during the so-called Liberal Reform; however, throughout the remainder of the century, Honduras and Japan maintained very limited contact, primarily due to the geographical distance between Central America and East Asia.

Honduran interest in Japan began to emerge during the early decades of the 20th century, coinciding with Japan's rise as a world power. The Honduran press began publishing information regarding Japan's economy, trade, and industry. The "Revista Económica", published in Tegucigalpa, reported on Japanese markets starting in 1911 and later dedicated articles to Japan's foreign trade and production.

During the 1920s, ties between Honduras and Japan also took on a commercial dimension. By 1926, one of the first Japanese delegations arrived in the country, seeking to formalize trade ties. Honduran business press began reporting on Japanese trade and production, while Japanese manufactured goods particularly low-priced cotton textiles began competing in the Honduran market.

=== 1930s and 1940s ===
Letter issued by the emperor to Carias Andino

Letter issued by the emperor after both nations formalized ties 1934, U.S. diplomatic sources noted that Japanese products had displaced American goods in a significant portion of the Honduran cotton textile market This already indicated the country's significant influence on the Honduran industry. At that time, Japan accounted for approximately 61.7% of Honduran imports of cotton products during that period.

Due to this Japanese economic influence in the country that the Honduran Foreign Ministry began to maintain formal diplomatic relations with the Empire of Japan in 1935, under the dictatorship of General Tiburcio Carias Andino after seeing interest in maintaining diplomatic relations with countries which later became part of the Axis powers. After that, the Honduran dictator would send a letter to Emperor Hirohito, which would be delivered by the foreign minister of the empire, Hachiro Arita, as a sign of affection for the Japanese people. The letter would be answered by the emperor himself, which said the following:

HIROHITO, by the grace of heaven, Emperor of Japan, placed on the throne eternally by the same dynasty, to his Excellency TIBURCIO CARIAS A., President of the Republic of Honduras. Great and good friend: with great pleasure we received your letter, dated April 20 of last year, by which your Excellency, pleases to announce to us that your Excellency pleases to announce to us that after revising the political constitution of the year 1924, the National Constituent Assembly has formed on March 28 last, the new constitution put into effect on April 15, 1936, and that in accordance with article 202 of the new Constitution, the presidential term of your Excellency that ends on January 1, 1936, will be valid until the end of the year. 1943. In presenting to Your Excellency our congratulations on the prolongation of your high office, we are convinced that the ties of friendship that exist between our two countries will be strengthened, and we express our most sincere wishes for the good fortune of Your Excellency, as well as for the prosperity of your nation. (f) EMPEROR HIROHITO. (r) Hachiro Arita Minister of Foreign Affairs. Hayama, the second day of the ninth month of the eleventh year of Showa.

From then on, interactions between the two nations were limited mainly to protocol exchanges and efforts by Japan to promote its image in the region. That same year, the Emperor appointed Yoshiatsu Hori then Japan's resident minister in Mexico as Envoy Extraordinary and Minister Plenipotentiary to Honduras and other Central American countries. His appointment was part of Japan's efforts to establish and consolidate diplomatic relations with Central American nations. By 1936, trade and diplomatic ties between Honduras and the empire of Japan were already fully strengthened And during the final years of the decade, Japan sought to expand its commercial presence in Central America as part of a broader policy of international economic expansion.

However, the relationship between Japan and the Western powers began to deteriorate due to the beginning of the Second Sino-Japanese War. Japan and its increasingly expansionist policy, although this did not have a direct impact on its relationship with Honduras, which remained on the sidelines of international conflicts.

=== World War II and post-war relations ===
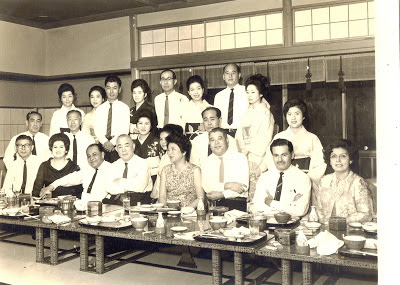
The diplomatic delegation of Honduras in Tokyo 1967. On the left side the photo appears Tiburcio Carias Castillo the representative of Honduras in the United Nations, son of the president who more than 30 years ago would send the letter to the Emperor.

Honduran relations with the Empire of the Rising Sun would be greatly damaged after the attack on Pearl Harbor in 1941, as the Honduran state would declare war on Japan and would be one of several Latin American countries that would enter World War II.

After the Japanese surrender and the official end of the war in 1945, Honduras and Japan would maintain a distant and cold relationship due to the context that the Japanese nation suffered at the end of the war. It would not be after the end of the American occupation, when Japan would have a new model of government when both nations would once again maintain bilateral agreements.

In September 1974, Japan would help Honduras after Hurricane Fifi, an act that managed to win the appreciation of the Honduran population. Something similar would happen in 1998, after the passage of Hurricane Mitch, the ministry that currently directs Honduras sent the first official mission of Japan Self-Defense Forces in support of rescue efforts.

== Aid and cooperation projects ==
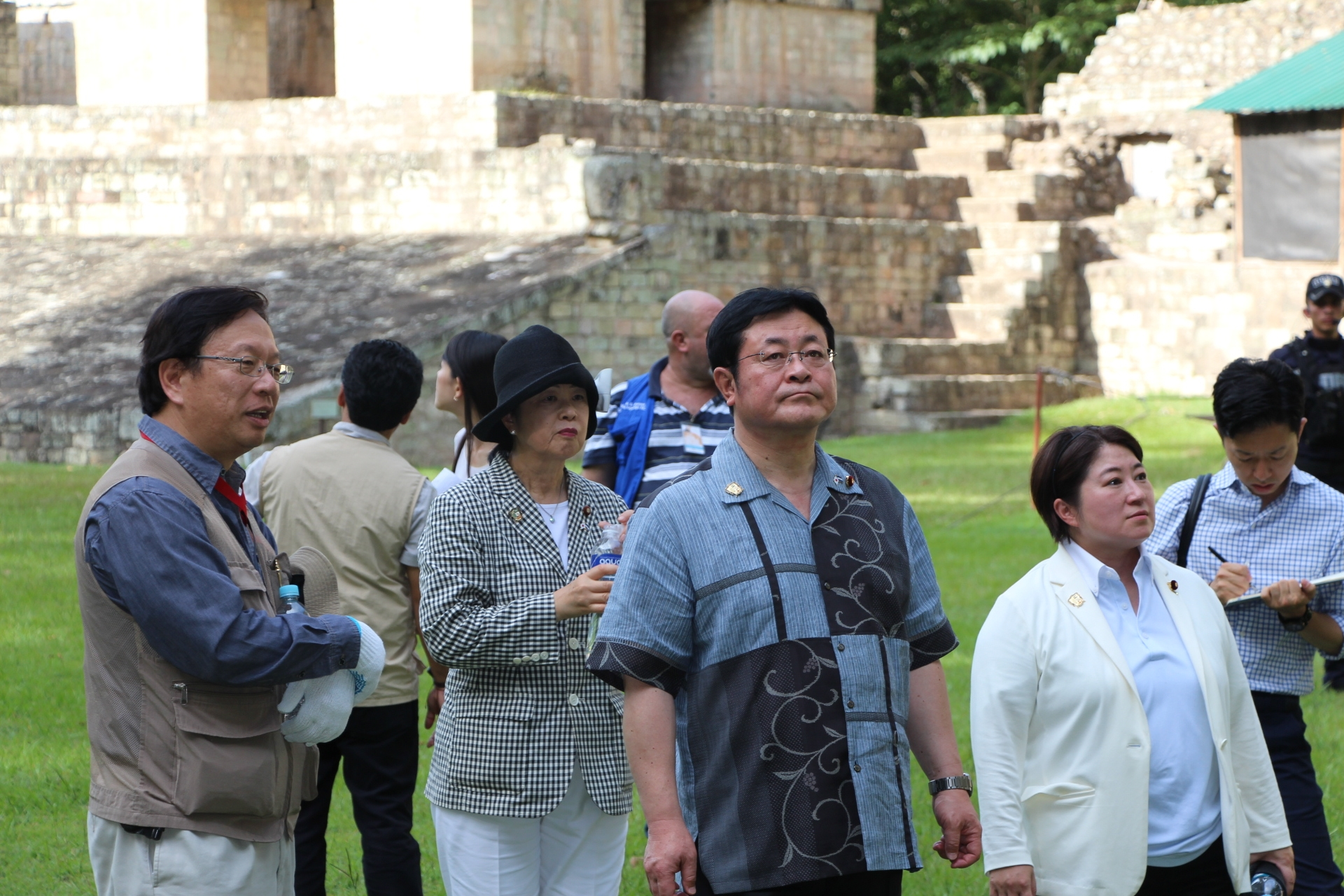
Visit of Japanese representatives to Copan in 2018

Japan and Honduras maintain good diplomatic and commercial relations, and the Asian country has provided the Central American nation with humanitarian aid for the development of the country. Among them, help for the construction of roads, bridges, hospitals, houses, and schools.

Other Japanese projects in Honduras are those made for the intention of the rescue and protection of Honduran heritage, such as the Japanese archaeologists who have come to study the Mayan cultural sites in Honduras. These archaeologists have also worked at other sites in Honduras, particularly in the study of the pre-Hispanic cultures that inhabited the region. The Japanese government has played an important role in financing archaeological projects in Honduras.

The Japan International Cooperation Agency (JICA) has been one of the institutions that has provided support through funds, scholarships and the collaboration of experts in various areas, including archaeology.The universities of Kyoto, Tokyo, and Kyushu have financed the expeditions to Honduras, collaborating with the Autonomous University of Honduras.

Cultural fairs have also been held between the two as a cultural exchange projects. One of the most significant areas of cultural cooperation has been educational exchange. Japan has offered scholarships to Honduran students to study at its universities, particularly through programs of the Japanese Ministry of Foreign Affairs.

== See also ==
- Foreign relations of Honduras
- Foreign relations of Japan
- Honduras in World War II
