= Japan–Paraguay relations =

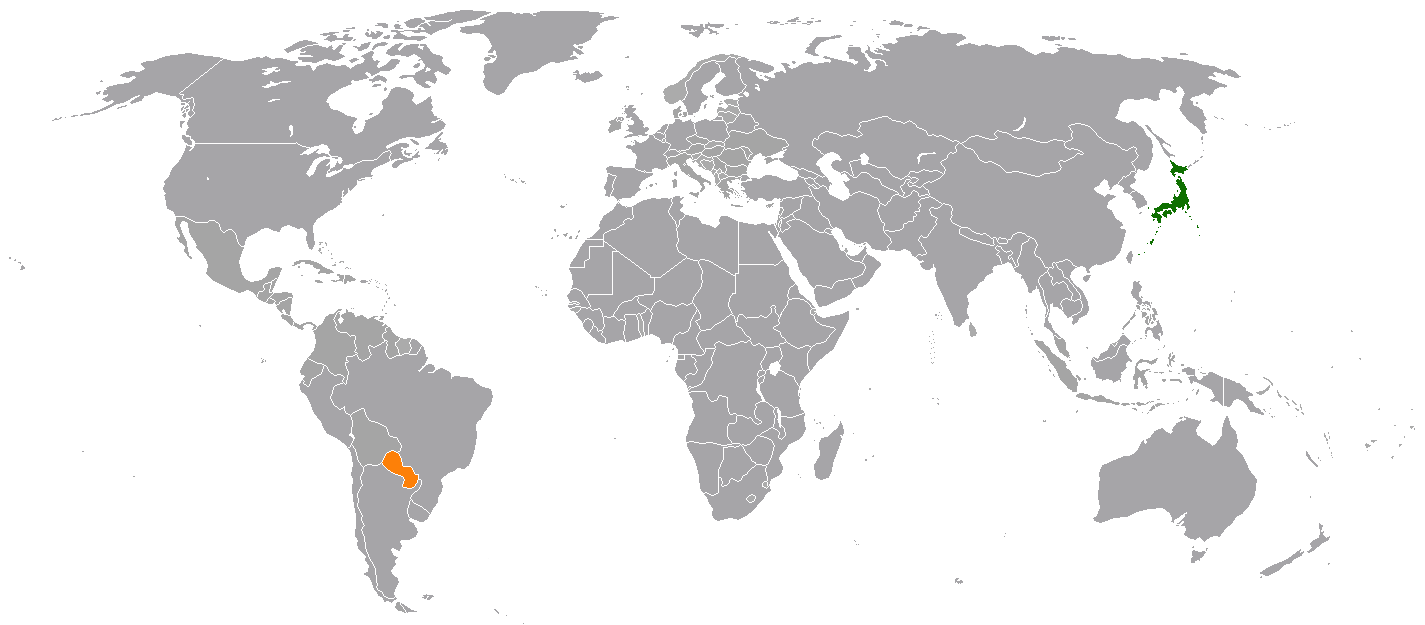

- Japan: Paraguay

Japan–Paraguay relations are foreign relations between Japan and Paraguay. Japan has an embassy in Asunción. Paraguay has an embassy in Tokyo. Both countries are full members of the United Nations and the World Trade Organization.

== History ==
With the signing of the bilateral Trade Agreement between both of them, the two countries established diplomatic relations on November 17, 1919.

The bilateral relations were suspended during World War II; in other words, Paraguay broke diplomatic relations with Japan, Germany, Italy and Spain on January 28, 1942, and then finally, Paraguay declared war on Japan, Germany and Spain on February 7, 1945.

On September 8, 1951, the definitive Treaty of Peace with Japan was signed in San Francisco by Japan, Paraguay, the United States and other 46 allied nations except communist states. By virtue of the ratification of the treaty on November 28, 1951 in Japan and on January 15, 1953 in Paraguay, their bilateral relations were restored.

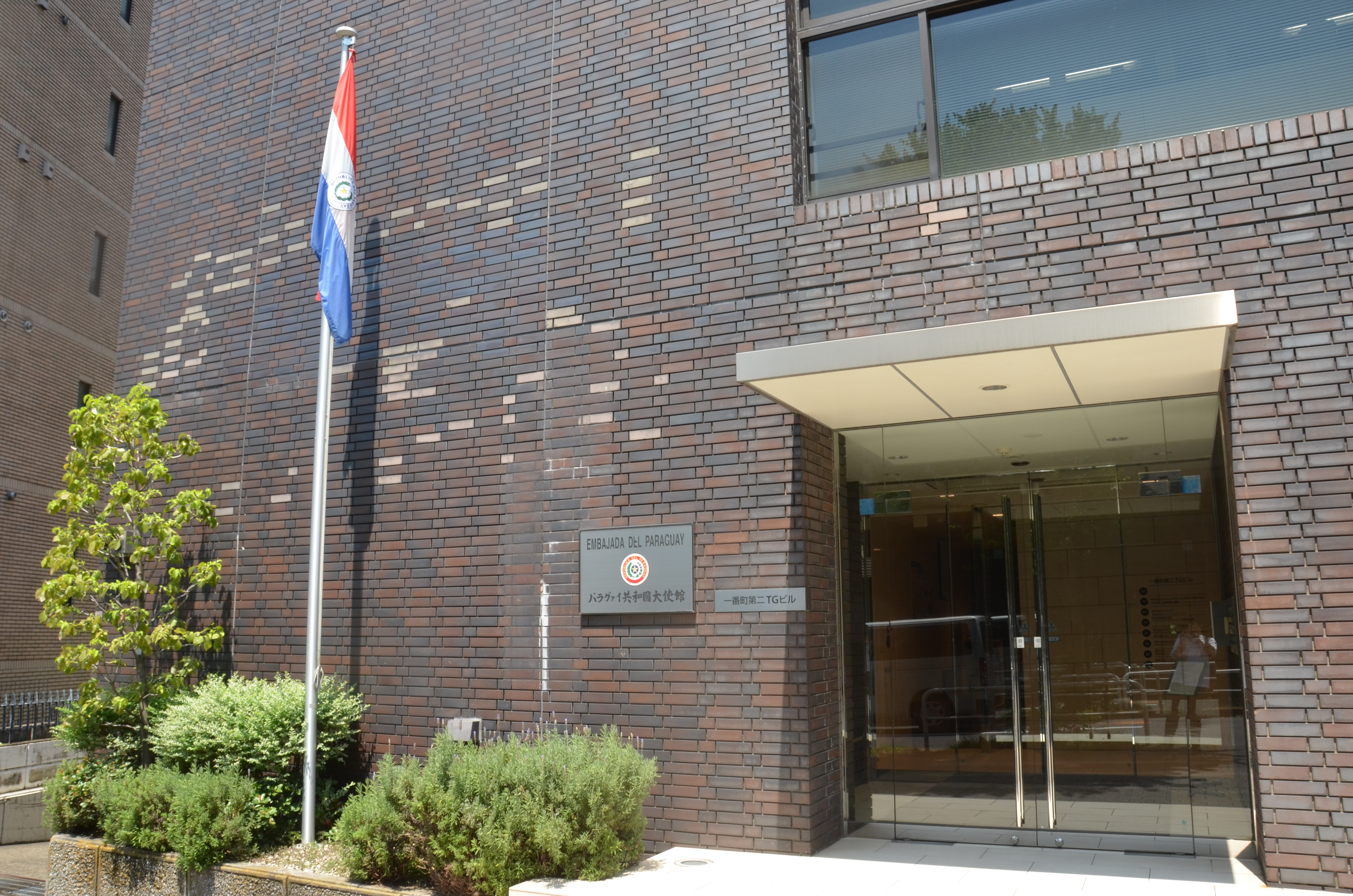
Embassy of Paraguay in Tokyo

== See also ==
- Japanese Paraguayans
- Foreign relations of Japan
- Foreign relations of Paraguay
- Japan–Latin America relations
