= Higashi, Shibuya =

District located in Shibuya ward in Tokyo, Japan

Higashi 東
- Residential district
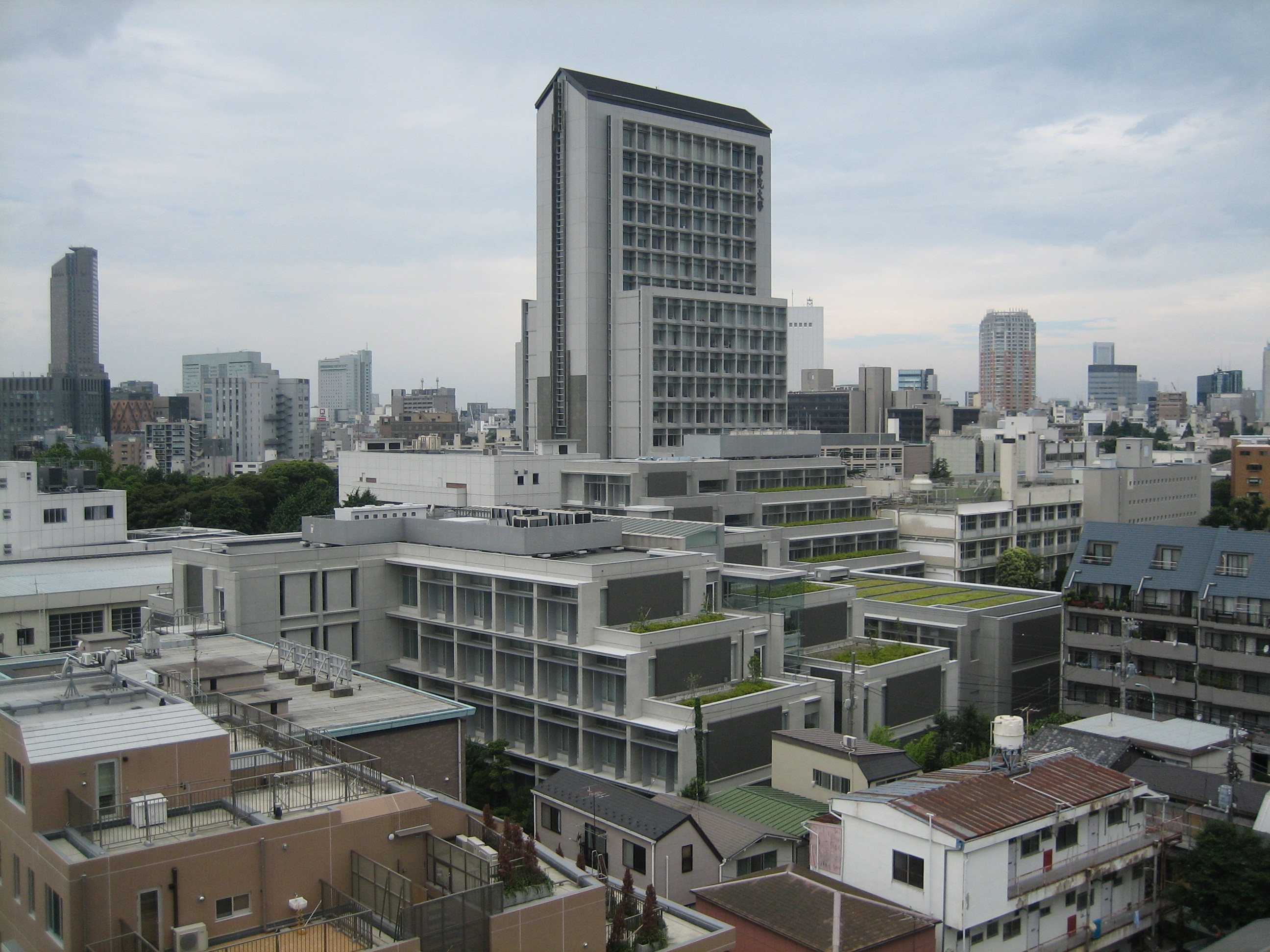
- Higashi, Shibuya campus

- Location in Japan
- Coordinates: 35°39′12″N 139°42′40″E
- Country: Japan
- Prefecture: Tokyo
- Special ward: Shibuya

Population (October 1, 2020)
  - Total: 8,530
- Time zone: UTC+09:00 (JST)
- ZIP code: 150-0011

Higashi (東) is a residential district of the Shibuya ward in Tokyo surrounded by the residential areas of Hiroo, Ebisu, Daikanyama and Aoyama. Prince Hitachi and Princess Hitachi have their official residence in a palace in large gardens off Komazawadori in Higashi.

The main campus of the Kokugakuin University is in Higashi. All literature, economics, law and Shinto studies students populate the Shibuya campus. At the end of January, 2006, it was decided that the name of the main building, which was recently developed, would be Wakagi Tower (若木タワー, Wakagi Tawā).

Shibuya Station and Ebisu Station serve as the nearest rail stations. There are bus services from Shibuya and Ebisu, serving the educational campuses in Higashi and the Japanese Red Cross Medical Center in Hiroo.

== Facilities ==
- Residence of Masahito, Prince Hitachi
- Embassy of Türkmenistan in Japan
- Onko Academic Society
- Shibuya Folk and Literary Shirane Memorial Museum, a museum of Shibuya's local history and literature
- Kokugakuin University
  - Kokugakuin University Museum, a museum of Japanese archeology and Shintō culture
- Jissen Women's University Junior College
- Shibuya Hikawa Shrine

== Education ==
Shibuya Board of Education operates public elementary and junior high schools.

All of Higashi 1-chome and parts of 2 and 3-chome are zoned to Tokiwamatsu Elementary School (常磐松小学校). Parts of Higashi 2, 3, and 4-chome are zoned to Hiroo Elementary School (広尾小学校). Parts of Higashi 2 and 3-chome are zoned to Nagayato Elementary School (長谷戸小学校).

Parts of Higashi 2, 3, and 4-chome are zoned to Hiroo Junior High School (広尾中学校). All of Higashi 1-chome and parts of 2, 3, and 4-chome are zoned to Hachiyama Junior High School (鉢山中学校).

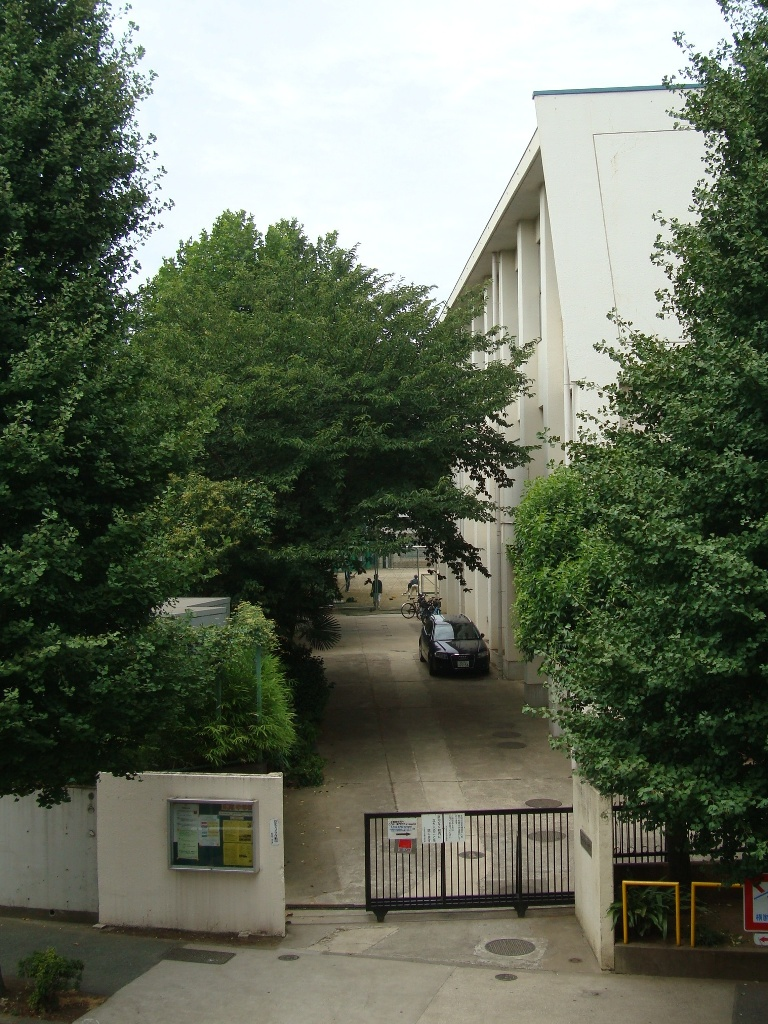
Hiroo Junior High School (広尾中学校)

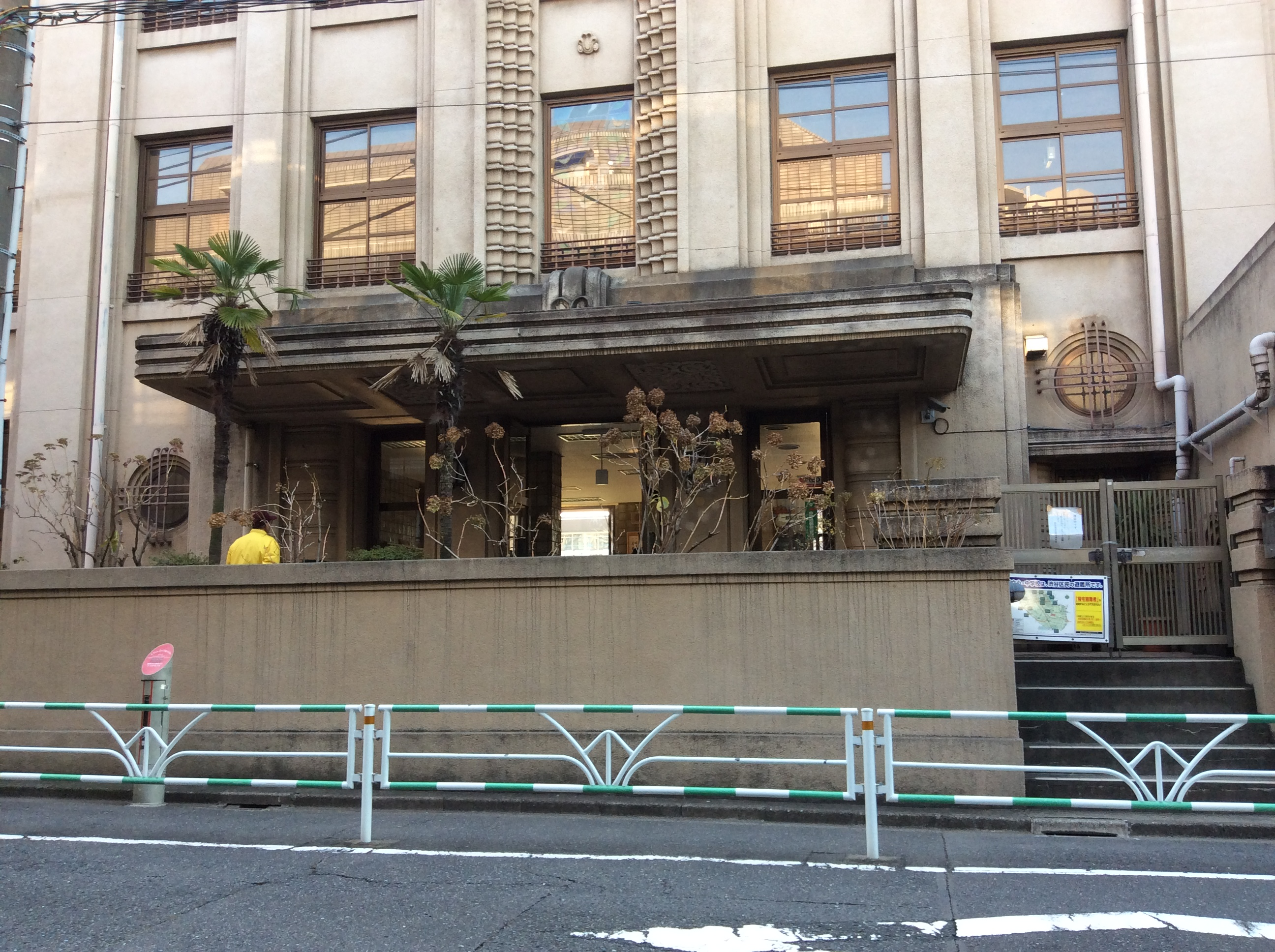
Hiroo Elementary School (広尾小学校)

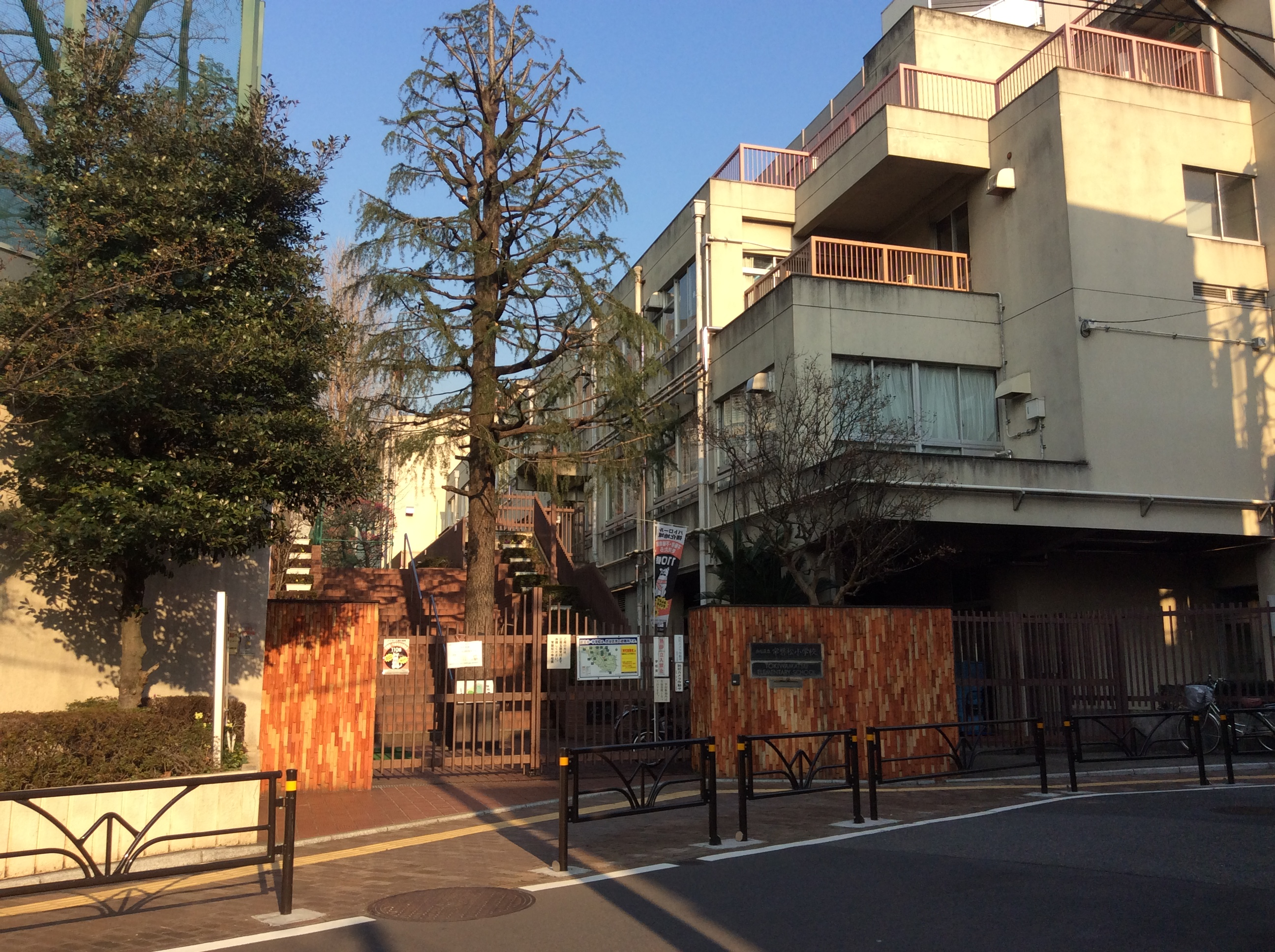
Tokiwamatsu Elementary School (常磐松小学校)
