= Masahito, Prince Hitachi =

Japanese prince (born 1935)

Masahito
- Prince Hitachi
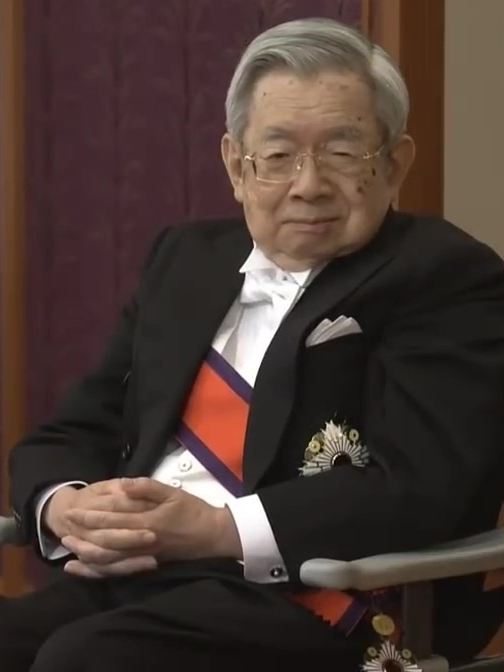
- Masahito in 2019
- Born: Masahito, Prince Yoshi (義宮正仁親王); 28 November 1935 (age 90); Tokyo Imperial Palace, Tokyo City, Empire of Japan
- Spouse: Hanako Tsugaru (m. 1964)
- House: Imperial House of Japan
- Father: Emperor Shōwa
- Mother: Princess Nagako Kuni

Masahito, Prince Hitachi (常陸宮正仁親王, Hitachi-no-miya Masahito Shinnō; born 28 November 1935) is a member of the Imperial House of Japan, the younger brother of Emperor emeritus Akihito and the paternal uncle of Emperor Naruhito. He is the second son and sixth born child of Emperor Shōwa and Empress Kōjun and is third and last in line to the Chrysanthemum Throne. He is mainly known for philanthropic activities and his research on the causes of cancer.

== Early life and education ==
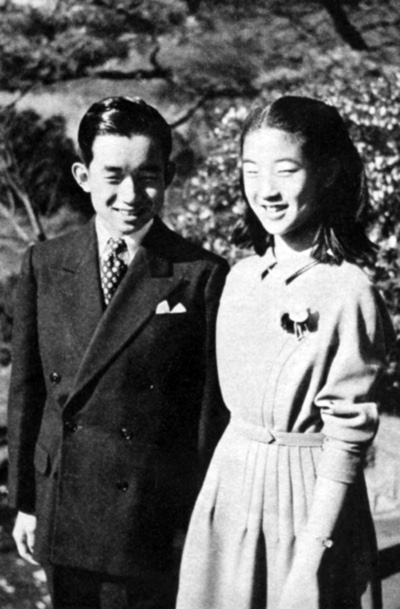
With his younger sister Princess Takako (1952)

Born at Tokyo Imperial Palace in Tokyo, Masahito held the childhood appellation Prince Yoshi (義宮正仁親王, Yoshi-no-miya Masahito Shinnō).

Masahito received his primary and secondary schooling at the Gakushūin Peers' School. In late 1944, the Imperial Household Ministry evacuated Prince Yoshi and the Crown Prince to Nikkō, to escape the American bombing of Tokyo.

After the war, from 1947 to 1950, Mrs. Elizabeth Gray Vining tutored both princes and their sisters, the Princesses Kazuko, Atsuko, and Takako, in the English language. Her account of the experience is entitled Windows for the Crown Prince (1952).

Prince Yoshi received his undergraduate degree in chemistry from the Faculty of Science at Gakushuin University in 1958. He subsequently did postgraduate work in the Faculty of Science at Tokyo University. In 1969, he became a Research Associate of the Japanese Foundation for Cancer Research specializing in the study of cellular division. The results of his research have been reported in the technical journals of the Japanese Cancer Association, as well as of the American Association for Cancer Research.

In 1997, Prince Hitachi received an honorary doctorate from George Washington University in the United States, and in April 2001 received another from the University of Minnesota. In March 1999, he became an honorary member of the German Association for Cancer Research, in recognition of his significant scientific contributions to the field of cancer research.

== Marriage ==
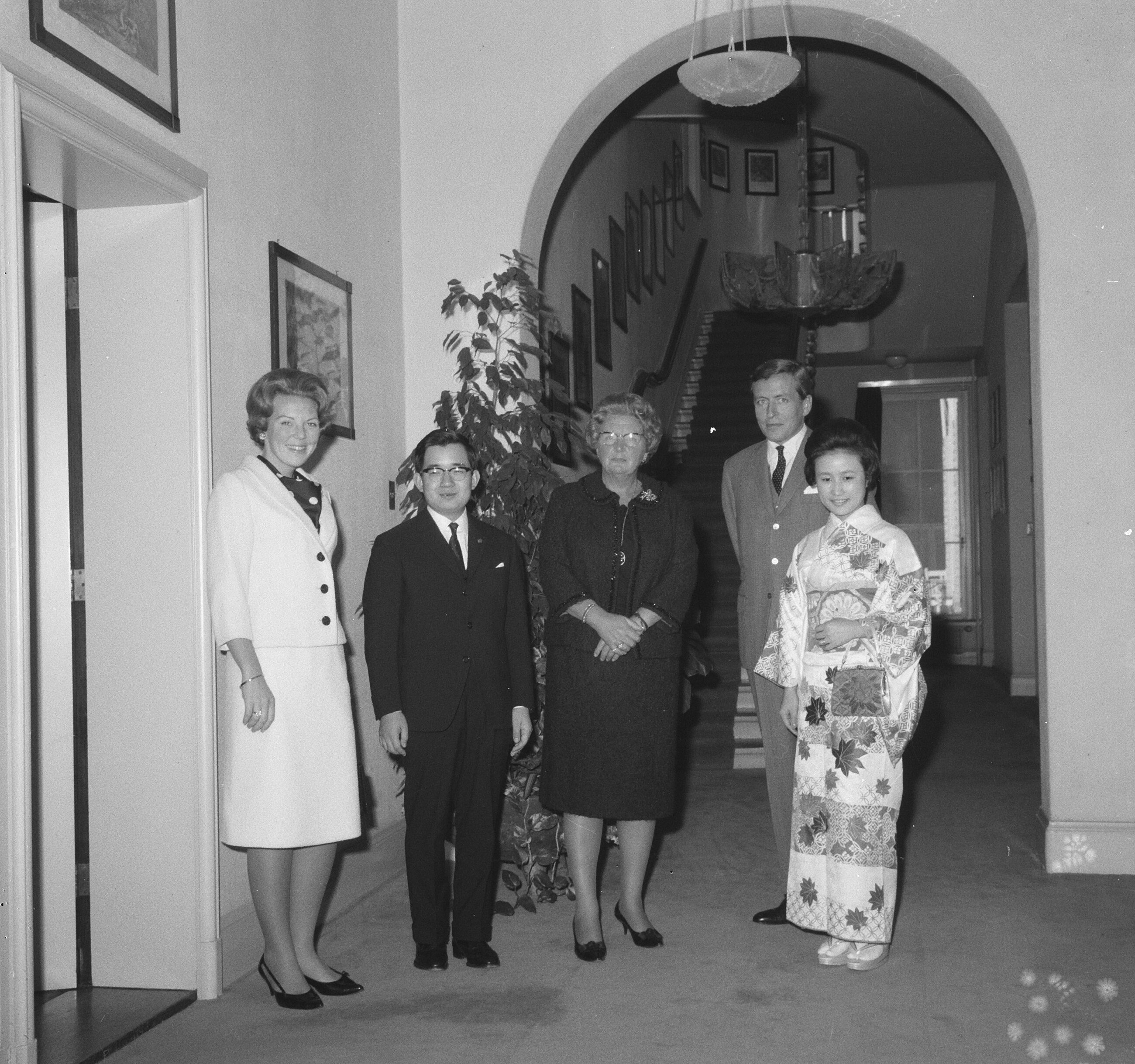
Prince Hitachi and Princess Hanako with Queen Juliana, Princess Beatrix and Prince Claus (at the Soestdijk Palace, 1965)

On 30 September 1964, the Prince married Hanako Tsugaru (born 19 July 1940), fourth daughter of the late Yoshitaka Tsugaru, a former count and a descendant of the daimyō of Tsugaru Domain. The following day, Emperor Shōwa granted him the title Hitachi-no-miya (Prince Hitachi), and authorization to start a new branch of the Imperial Family in celebration of his wedding.

Prince and Princess Hitachi have their official residence in a palace in large gardens off Komazawadori in Higashi, Shibuya. They have no children.

In July 2026, the Japanese government amended the Imperial Household Law which made it possible for Prince Hitachi to adopt a male member of the former shinnōke or ōke collateral branches of the imperial family in an effort to address the Japanese imperial succession debate.

== Public service ==
Prince Hitachi is the honorary president of a wide variety of charitable organizations, especially those involving international exchange. Most recently, Prince and Princess Hitachi visited Nicaragua and El Salvador, to mark the 70th anniversary of the establishment of diplomatic relations with both countries in October 2005. They also made a visit to France in September 2007 and Peru, marking the celebration of 110 years since the establishment of a Japanese community in this country, June 2009.

== Health ==
Prince Hitachi suffered from fever in late February 2023 and was hospitalized on 1 March. He was diagnosed with ureteral stones for which he underwent ureteral stenting the day after at the Japanese Red Cross Medical Center. He was discharged from hospital on 5 March. On 21 March, he underwent ureteral lithotripsy and was discharged on 24 March. He was readmitted to hospital with a fever and loss of appetite on 2 April, and was subsequently diagnosed with a urinary tract infection. He was discharged from hospital on 24 April.

== Titles and styles ==
Mon of the Hitachi branch of the Imperial Family

- 28 November 1935 – 1 October 1964: His Imperial Highness Prince Yoshi
- 1 October 1964 – present: His Imperial Highness Prince Hitachi

== Honours ==
=== National honours ===
- Japan: Grand Cordon of the Order of the Chrysanthemum (28 November 1955)

=== Foreign honours ===
- Denmark: Knight of the Order of the Elephant (28 September 1965)
- Italy: Knight Grand Cross of the Order of Merit of the Italian Republic (22 November 1965)
- Nepal: Member of the Order of the Benevolent Ruler (19 April 1960)

=== Honorary degree ===
- 1997: Doctor of Science, George Washington University
- 2001: Doctor of Science, University of Minnesota
- Chiang Mai University

=== Honorary positions ===
- President of the Japanese Society for the Preservation of Birds
- President of the Japanese Society for Disabled Children
- President of the Japan Institute of Invention and Innovation
- President of the Japan-Denmark Society
- President of the Dainippon Silk Foundation
- President of the Japanese Society for Rehabilitation of Persons with Disabilities
- President of the Japan Art Association
- President of the Tokyo Zoological Park Society
- President of Maison Franco-Japonaise
- President of the Princess Takamatsu Cancer Research Fund
- Honorary President of the Japan-Sweden Society
- Honorary President of the Japan-Belgium Society
- Honorary President of the Japanese Foundation for Cancer Research
- Honorary President of Association Pasteur Japon
- Honorary Vice-President of the Japanese Red Cross Society

== Ancestry ==
Ancestors of Masahito, Prince Hitachi

8. Mutsuhito, Emperor Meiji
4. Yoshihito, Emperor Taishō
9. Lady Naruko Yanagihara
2. Hirohito, Emperor Shōwa
10. Prince Kujō Michitaka of the Fujiwara Clan
5. Lady Sadako Kujō
11. Lady Ikuko Noma
1. Masahito, Prince Hitachi
12. Asahiko, 1st Imperial Prince Kuni
6. Kuniyoshi, 2nd Imperial Prince Kuni
13. Lady Makiko Izumi
3. Princess Nagako of Kuni
14. Prince Shimazu Tadayoshi
7. Princess Chikako Shimazu
15. Lady Sumako Yamazaki

=== Patrilineal descent ===
Patrilineal descent

Imperial House of Japan

1. Descent prior to Keitai is unclear to modern historians, but traditionally traced back patrilineally to Emperor Jimmu
2. Emperor Keitai, ca. 450–534
3. Emperor Kinmei, 509–571
4. Emperor Bidatsu, 538–585
5. Prince Oshisaka, ca. 556–???
6. Emperor Jomei, 593–641
7. Emperor Tenji, 626–671
8. Prince Shiki, ???–716
9. Emperor Kōnin, 709–786
10. Emperor Kanmu, 737–806
11. Emperor Saga, 786–842
12. Emperor Ninmyō, 810–850
13. Emperor Kōkō, 830–867
14. Emperor Uda, 867–931
15. Emperor Daigo, 885–930
16. Emperor Murakami, 926–967
17. Emperor En'yū, 959–991
18. Emperor Ichijō, 980–1011
19. Emperor Go-Suzaku, 1009–1045
20. Emperor Go-Sanjō, 1034–1073
21. Emperor Shirakawa, 1053–1129
22. Emperor Horikawa, 1079–1107
23. Emperor Toba, 1103–1156
24. Emperor Go-Shirakawa, 1127–1192
25. Emperor Takakura, 1161–1181
26. Emperor Go-Toba, 1180–1239
27. Emperor Tsuchimikado, 1196–1231
28. Emperor Go-Saga, 1220–1272
29. Emperor Go-Fukakusa, 1243–1304
30. Emperor Fushimi, 1265–1317
31. Emperor Go-Fushimi, 1288–1336
32. Emperor Kōgon, 1313–1364
33. Emperor Sukō, 1334–1398
34. Prince Yoshihito Fushimi, 1351–1416
35. Prince Sadafusa Fushimi, 1372–1456
36. Emperor Go-Hanazono, 1419–1471
37. Emperor Go-Tsuchimikado, 1442–1500
38. Emperor Go-Kashiwabara, 1464–1526
39. Emperor Go-Nara, 1495–1557
40. Emperor Ōgimachi, 1517–1593
41. Prince Masahito, 1552–1586
42. Emperor Go-Yōzei, 1572–1617
43. Emperor Go-Mizunoo, 1596–1680
44. Emperor Reigen, 1654–1732
45. Emperor Higashiyama, 1675–1710
46. Prince Naohito Kanin, 1704–1753
47. Prince Sukehito Kanin, 1733–1794
48. Emperor Kōkaku, 1771–1840
49. Emperor Ninkō, 1800–1846
50. Emperor Kōmei, 1831–1867
51. Emperor Meiji, 1852–1912
52. Emperor Taishō, 1879–1926
53. Emperor Shōwa, 1901–1989
54. Masahito, Prince Hitachi

Masahito, Prince Hitachi Imperial House of Japan Born: 28 November 1935
Lines of succession
Preceded by Prince Hisahito of Akishino	Line of succession to the Japanese throne 3rd in line	Last in line
