= Hanako, Princess Hitachi =

Japanese princess (born 1940)

Hanako
- Princess Hitachi
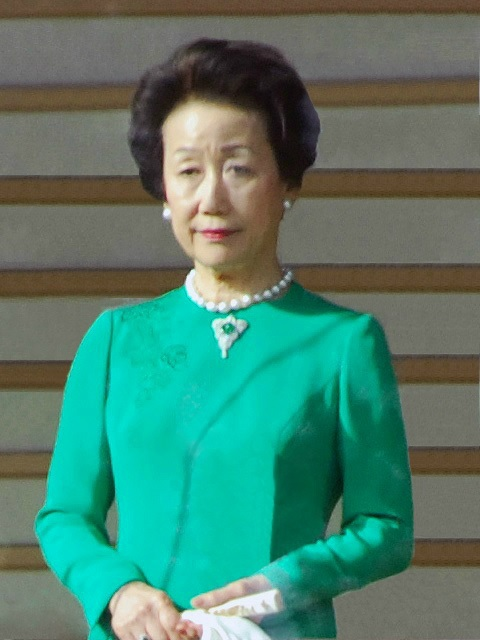
- Hanako in 2012
- Born: Hanako Tsugaru (津軽華子); 19 July 1940 (age 86); Tokyo City, Empire of Japan
- Spouse: Masahito, Prince Hitachi (m. 1964)
- House: Imperial House of Japan (by marriage)
- Father: Yoshitaka Tsugaru
- Mother: Hisako Mōri

Hanako, Princess Hitachi (正仁親王妃華子, Masahito Shinnōhi Hanako) (born Hanako Tsugaru (津軽華子, Tsugaru Hanako); 19 July 1940), is a member of the Japanese imperial family as the wife of Masahito, Prince Hitachi, who is the younger son of Emperor Shōwa and the only brother of Emperor Emeritus Akihito. By marriage, she is the aunt of Emperor Naruhito.

== Early life and education ==
She was born at Tsugaru's family home in Tokyo, she is the fourth daughter of Count Yoshitaka Tsugaru (1907–1994), the last representative of the Tsugaru clan and adopted son of the daimyō of the Tsugaru Domain (present-day Hirosaki, Aomori). Yoshitaka Tsugaru was originally from the Owari branch of the Tokugawa clan. He was also a member of the aristocracy created by the Meiji Restoration (kazoku).

Her mother, Hisako Mōri (1911–2004), was a descendant of the Mōri clan and also of the former daimyō of Chōshū Domain in the former province of Nagato (present-day Yamaguchi).

Hanako Tsugaru attended the prestigious Gakushūin School for her primary, junior high, and high school education, a school for Peers founded to educate the children of the imperial family and the imperial aristocracy (kuge). She graduated from the Gakushūin Women's Junior College in 1961.

== Marriage ==
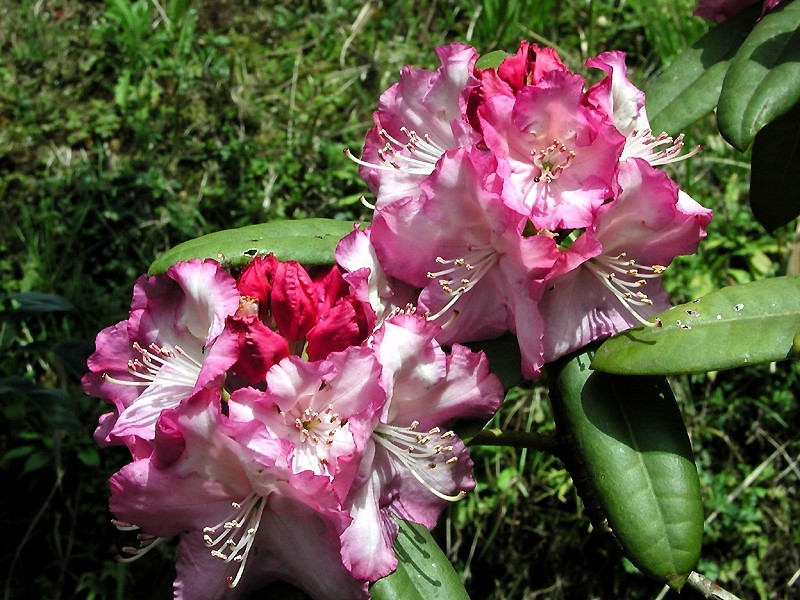
Rhododendron subg. Hymenanthes, designated imperial personal emblem of Hanako

Hanako met her future husband, Prince Masahito, during her studies at Gakushuin. The Imperial Household Council announced the engagement of Prince Masahito and Hanako Tsugaru on 28 February 1964 and the engagement ceremony was held on 14 April 1964. The wedding ceremony took place on 30 September 1964. For the time being, Hanako was the last imperial bride who would have been eligible to marry into the Imperial Family of Japan even before the end of World War II. Upon marriage, Prince Masahito received the title Prince Hitachi (Hitachi-no-miya – strictly "Prince Hitachi") and authorization from the Imperial Household Economy Council to form a new branch of the Imperial Family. As tradition dictates, upon her entry into the imperial family and like other members, she received a personal emblem (o-shirushi (お印)): Rhododendron subg. Hymenanthes (Shakunage (シャクナゲ)). They have no children.

Since December 1976, Prince Hitachi and Princess Hitachi have their official residence in a palace in large grounds off Komazawadori in Higashi in the district of Shibuya in Tokyo.

== Public service ==
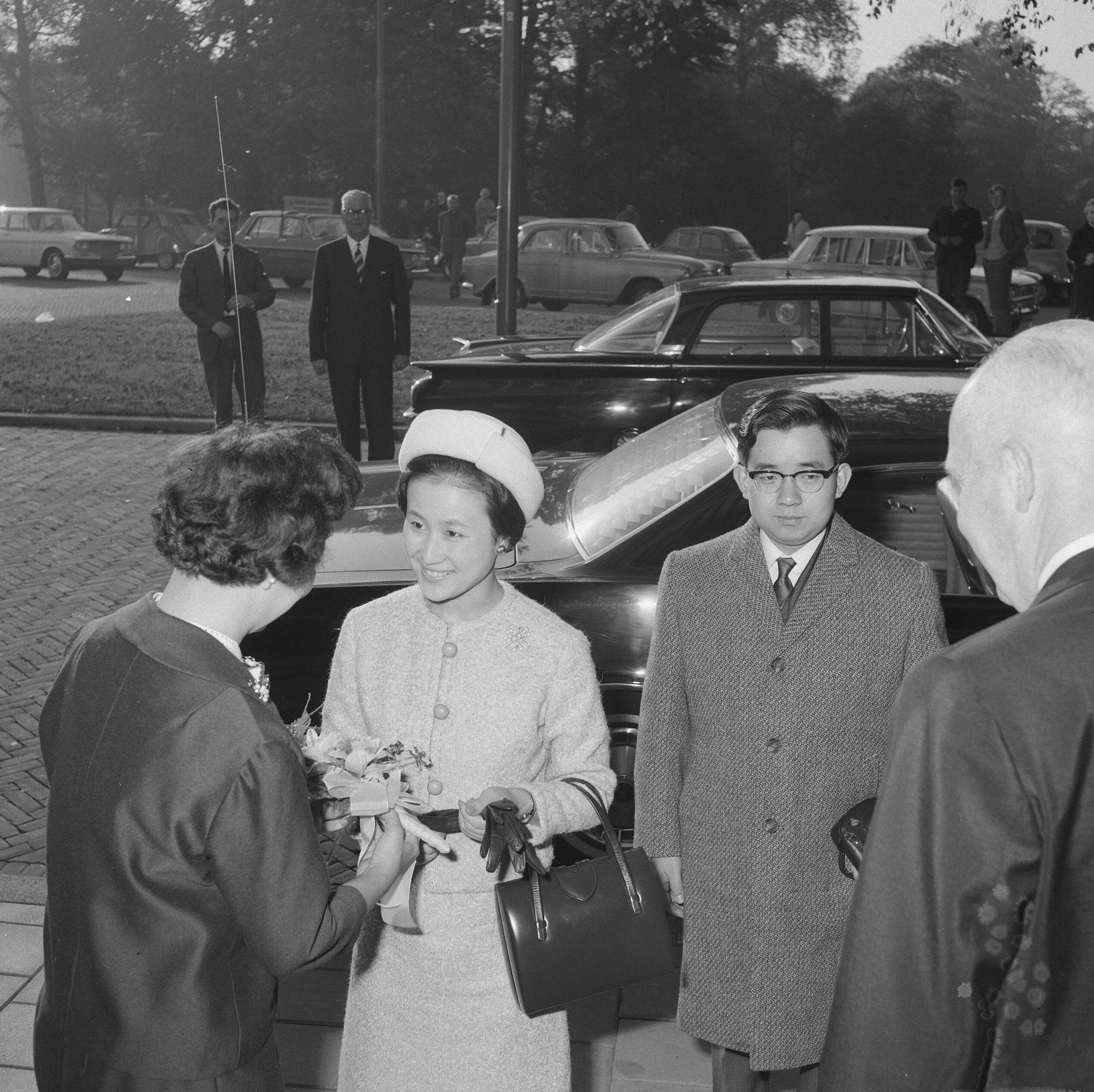
Prince and Princess Hitachi during a visit to the Netherlands in 1965

Princess Hitachi, like her husband, was elected on 5 September 2007 by the other members of the imperial family to be one of their main representatives (there are two in total) to the Imperial Household Council as a member. Both the members and reserve members, including Princess Hitachi, were re-elected on 7 September 2011. In 2017, the Princess was diagnosed with lumbar spondylosis and was hospitalized in September for further treatments. She made her first public appearance in April 2018. It was her first public engagement in 11 months.

Princess Hitachi is president of various organizations that concern themselves with welfare and the arts. She has also translated various children's books from English into Japanese.

=== Translation ===
Princess Hitachi has translated various children books from English into Japanese.

- The Eighty-Ninth Kitten by Eleanor Nilsson (published in 1987)
- The Most Obedient Dog in the World, by Anita Jeram (published in 1996)
- It was Jake, by Anita Jeram (published in 1997)
- A Guide Dog Puppy Grows Up, by Caroline Arnold (published in 2001)

== Titles and styles ==
Mon of the Hitachi branch of the imperial family

Hanako is styled as Her Imperial Highness Princess Hitachi.

== Honours ==
=== National honours ===
- Japan:
  - Grand Cordon (Paulownia) of the Order of the Precious Crown
  - Dame of the Decoration of the Red Cross
  - Recipient of the Red Cross Medal

=== Foreign honours ===
- Nepal: Member of the Order of the Benevolent Ruler (19 April 1960)

=== Honorary positions ===
- Member of the Imperial House Council
- Honorary President of the Japan Ikebana Art Association
- Honorary President of the Japan Animal Welfare Society
- Honorary President of the Japan Equestrian Federation
- Honorary President of the Nippon-Latin American Ladies' Association
- Honorary Vice-President of the Japanese Red Cross Society

== Ancestry ==
On both sides of her family, Princess Hitachi is descended from the old feudal aristocracy. She is a second cousin once removed of the late Kikuko, Princess Takamatsu who was, as were both Princess Hitachi's parents, a descendant of the Tokugawa clan of Mito. She is also a second cousin to Takamasa Ikeda, former head of the Ikeda clan and husband of her sister-in-law (and fifth cousin), Atsuko Ikeda. The late Setsuko, Princess Chichibu was also a descendant of the Mito-Tokugawa line, and was her fourth cousin once removed.

Prince and Princess Hitachi are also cousins several times over, but are most directly fifth cousins through their descent from the Ōgimachisanjō clan; their most recent common ancestor is their four-times great-grandfather Ōgimachisanjō Kinnori (1774–1800), a senior courtier. As a result, Princess Hitachi is also a fifth cousin of the present Emperor and his siblings. and both a fourth cousin (once removed) and a fifth cousin of Yuriko, Princess Mikasa.
