= Japan–Venezuela relations =

- Japan: Venezuela

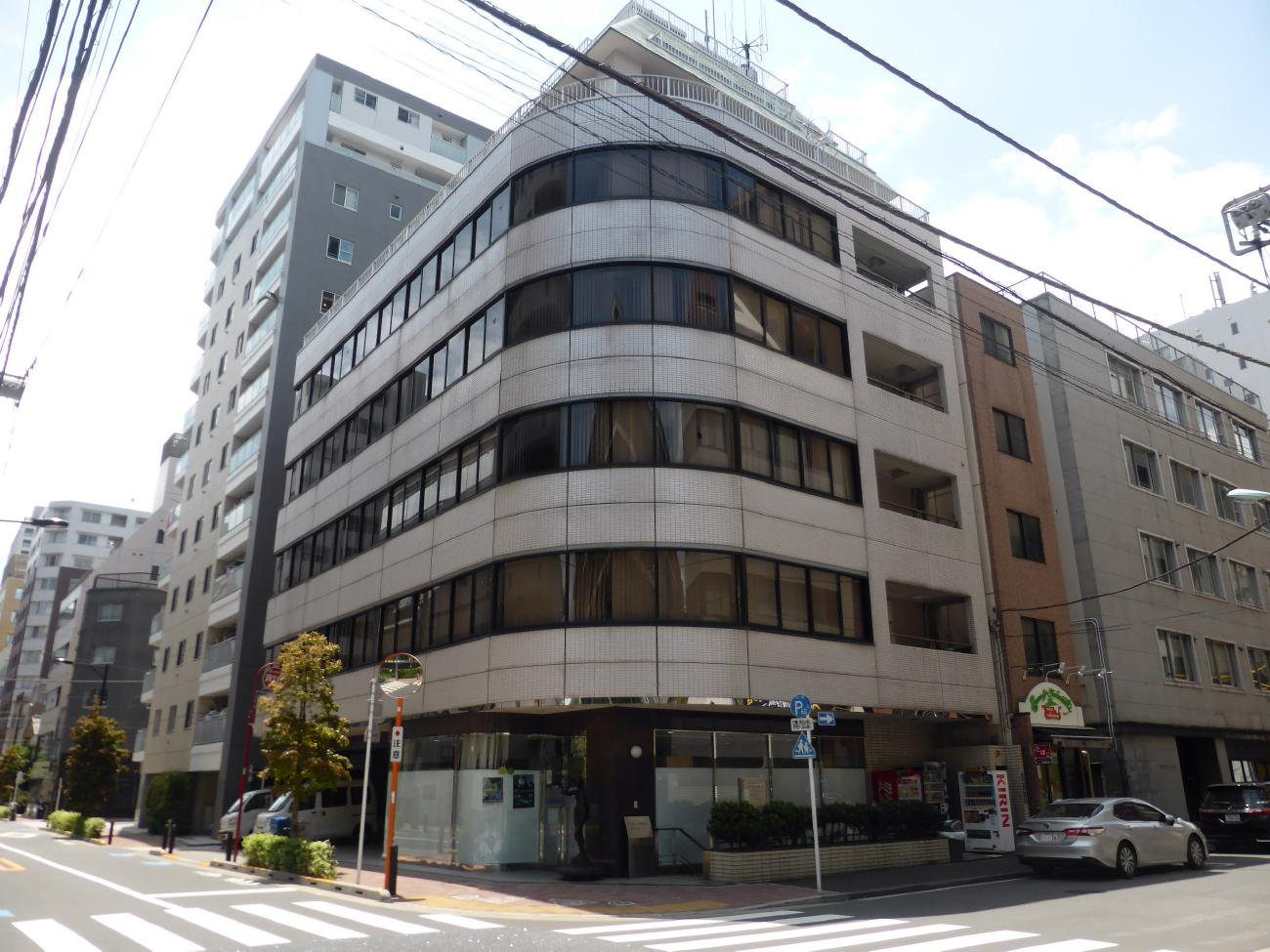
Embassy of Venezuela in Tokyo

Japan–Venezuela relations are bilateral relations between Japan and Venezuela. Formal diplomatic relations between the countries were established in August 1938. Venezuela broke off diplomatic ties with Japan (and the other Axis powers) in December 1941, shortly after the Japanese attack on Pearl Harbor.

Japanese banks Marubeni and Mitsui loaned Venezuela $3.5 billion in 2007 to be repaid in oil. The Japan Bank for International Cooperation provided $1.89 billion in loans to support the banks.

Japan imported US$1 bn worth of goods from Venezuela in 2008, mainly aluminium, iron ore and cacao.

On 23 December 2009, Chavez threatened to expropriate Toyota Motor Corp.'s local assembly plant.

In February 2019, Japan recognized Venezuelan opposition leader Juan Guaidó as Venezuelan president, cutting off relations with the disputed government of left-wing Nicolás Maduro, the successor of late Hugo Chavez.

== High-level visits ==
In 1999, Venezuelan President Hugo Chavez made a three-day trip to Japan.

Hugo Chavez made another two-day trip in 2009, during which he met Prime Minister Taro Aso. During the trip they agreed to cooperate on oil and gas developments and form a committee to study financing development and exploration. Japan and Venezuela signed a dozen other accords as part of Chavez's visit.

== See also ==
- Foreign relations of Japan
- Foreign relations of Venezuela
- Japanese Venezuelan

== Sources ==
- Yamaguchi, Mari (April 6, 2009). "Japanese, Venezuelan leaders agree to deepen ties". Yahoo News. Archived from the original on April 9, 2009.
- Kim, Chang-Ran (April 6, 2009). "Japan, Venezuela sign broad oil, gas cooperation". Reuters UK. Archived from the original on January 4, 2013.
- "VENEZUELA BREAKS WITH AXIS REGIMES; Move Hailed as Evidence of Nation's Faithfulness to American Obligations BRAZIL REAFFIRMS STAND Vargas Declares All Doubts Were Resolved by Attack on the United States". New York Times. January 1, 1942.
- "Japan: Venezuelan President Chavez arrives for three-day visit". Kyodo News Service, Tokyo. October 13, 1999.
