= Liberal Reform (Honduras) =

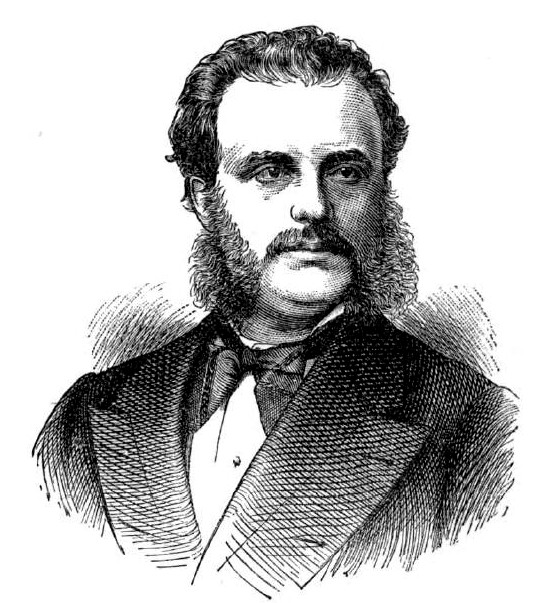
President Marco Aurelio Soto.

The Liberal Reform of Honduras was a political and socio-economic process aimed at the transformation and the bing end the old political order that had been taking hold since the era of the Spanish empire during the colony. The Liberal Reform officially began with the rise to power of Dr. Marco Aurelio Soto in 1876 within the framework of the Belle Époque and the rise of imperialism in the western world. This series of constitutional, economic and social reforms would not be completed until 1883, but the effects and progress of these would continue for the rest of the late 19th and early 20th centuries.

President Soto and Ramón Rosa, the Secretary General of the Government at the time, were the main ideologues of the Liberal Reform in Honduras. However, despite the fact that many social and economic advances were achieved in terms of modernization of infrastructure, more individual freedom, education, and religious freedom, some experts say that it remained unfinished, since all the goals that were expected to be met were not achieved due to various internal problems.

== History ==
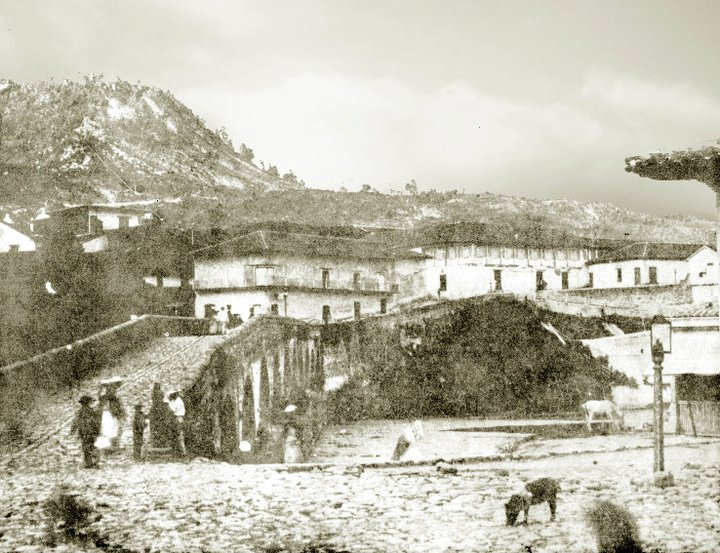
A daguerreotype showing Tegucigalpa in 1853, considered the oldest photograph of Honduras, taken by the Austrian explorer and diplomat Karl Von Scherzer. It accurately reflects the national reality before the liberal reforms.

Honduras separated from the Central American federation in 1839 and until the mid-19th century the country did not see many social changes beyond some projects such as the construction of schools initiated by General Trinidad Cabañas. However, for the country there were some military and diplomatic victories, such as the victory over the Olancho rebels in the so-called "Olancho War" where the Olancho sought their independence, the "War of the Priests", where the Catholic clergy rebelled against the state generating a civil war, the obtaining territories of the Mosquito Coast and the Reincorporation of the colony of the Bay Islands after the Treaty of Wike-Cruz.

This caused Honduras to be in a situation where it had to take the reins and seek foreign investment and begin a political and economic reform that would improve the situation of the country. This was also due to the political situation of the world when the European powers were going through the second industrial revolution and other non-Western nations such as Japan began to modernize in the so-called Meiji Restoration, as well as the birth of new nations such as with the German unification and the arrival of nationalism. Thus, President Soto would initiate the opening of Honduras to the world. This openness came with changes to the constitution of the republic, in addition to promoting immigration and foreign investment.

=== Immigration ===
Through the opening of immigration, many Chinese, Arabs, and Europeans arrived on Honduran soil, thus starting their first businesses. These new groups became new adherents to the national identity of the country. This also brought new ways of understanding the economy and business on Honduran soil, as many of these immigrants brought their own business styles and new merchandise.

Honduras went from being a country with the Catholic Church as part of the state to becoming a secular state. This brought with it new religious communities such as Protestants, Orthodox, and Jews, although it may also be that some few Muslims arrived with the Arab migration. The separation of state and church was achieved with much support from the political class, although the Catholic Church lost certain privileges, it was able to continue having an important role in Honduran society and politics, although it no longer had the power to decide on major political matters or get involved in political dessisions as it was in the colonial period and the first decades of republicanism. It is worth mentioning that since the presidency of General Morazan there were no major attempts to limit the power of the church, until the reform.

=== Infraestructure ===
Honduras experienced an improvement in its infrastructure because the country still had the same appearance it had since the beginning of the century, therefore the task of constructing new administrative buildings, schools, hospitals, railroads, train stations, bridges was undertaken, and above all the city was renovated to give it a new aesthetic style. Until the 1880s, Honduras did not have any significant modern infrastructure, either governmental, medical or educational, all it had were old buildings from previous centuries built by the Spanish colonial authorities.

The construction of buildings with new architectural styles like neoclassical that came about thanks to the reform continued until the beginning of the 20th century. Some of these buildings that still exist today are:

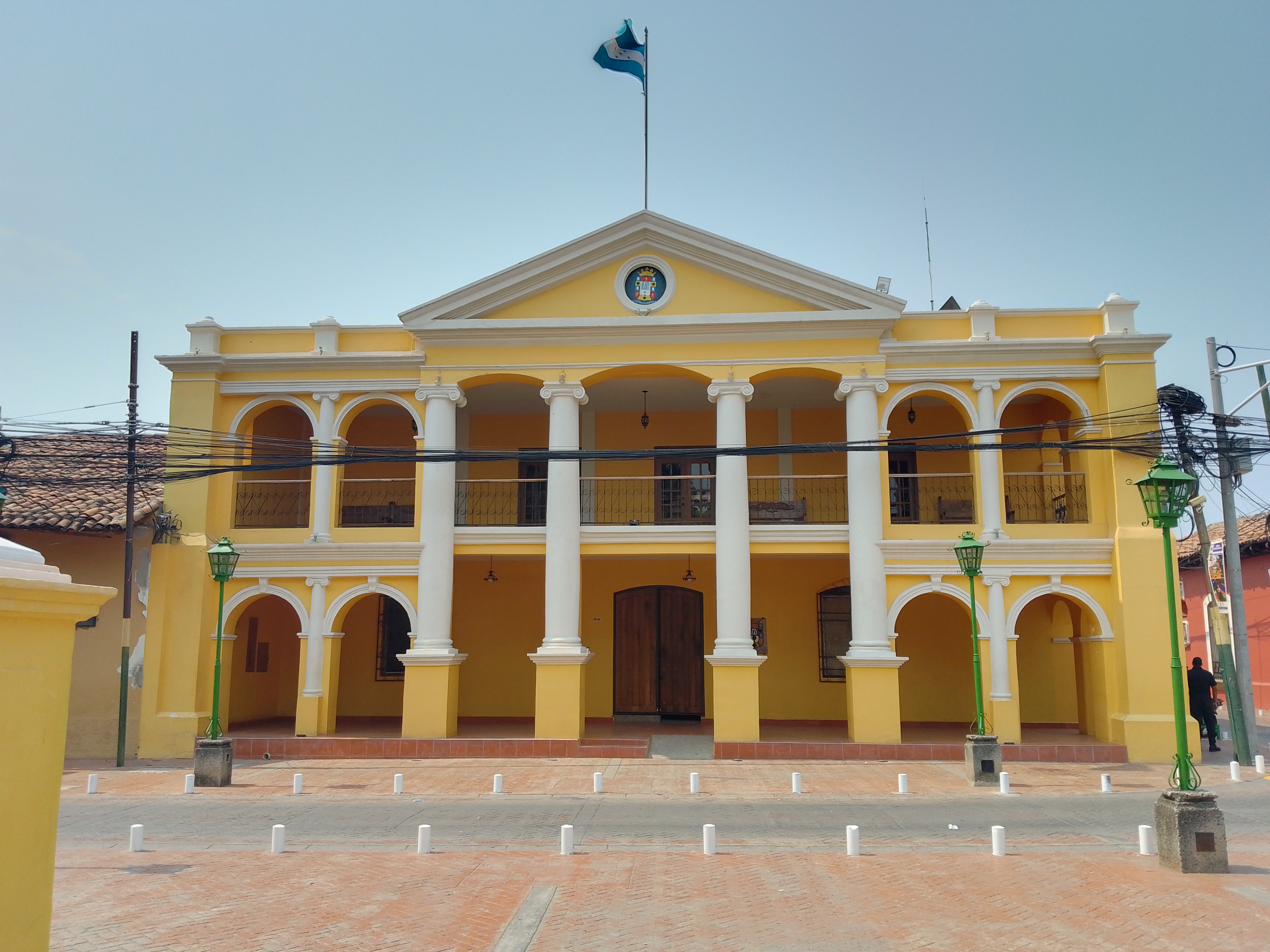
Comayagua municipal palace

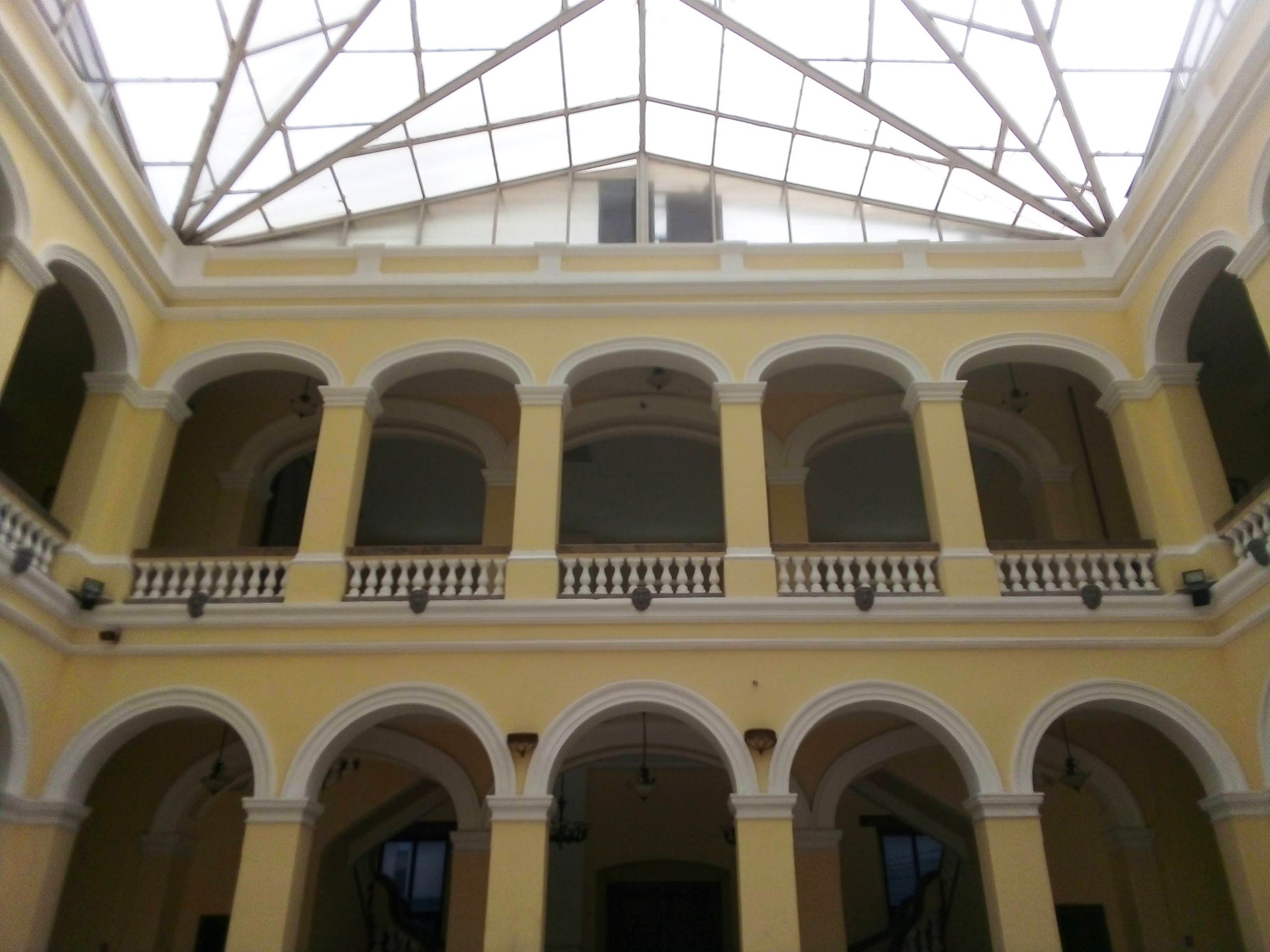
Former Palace of the Ministries, today known as the Museum of National identity

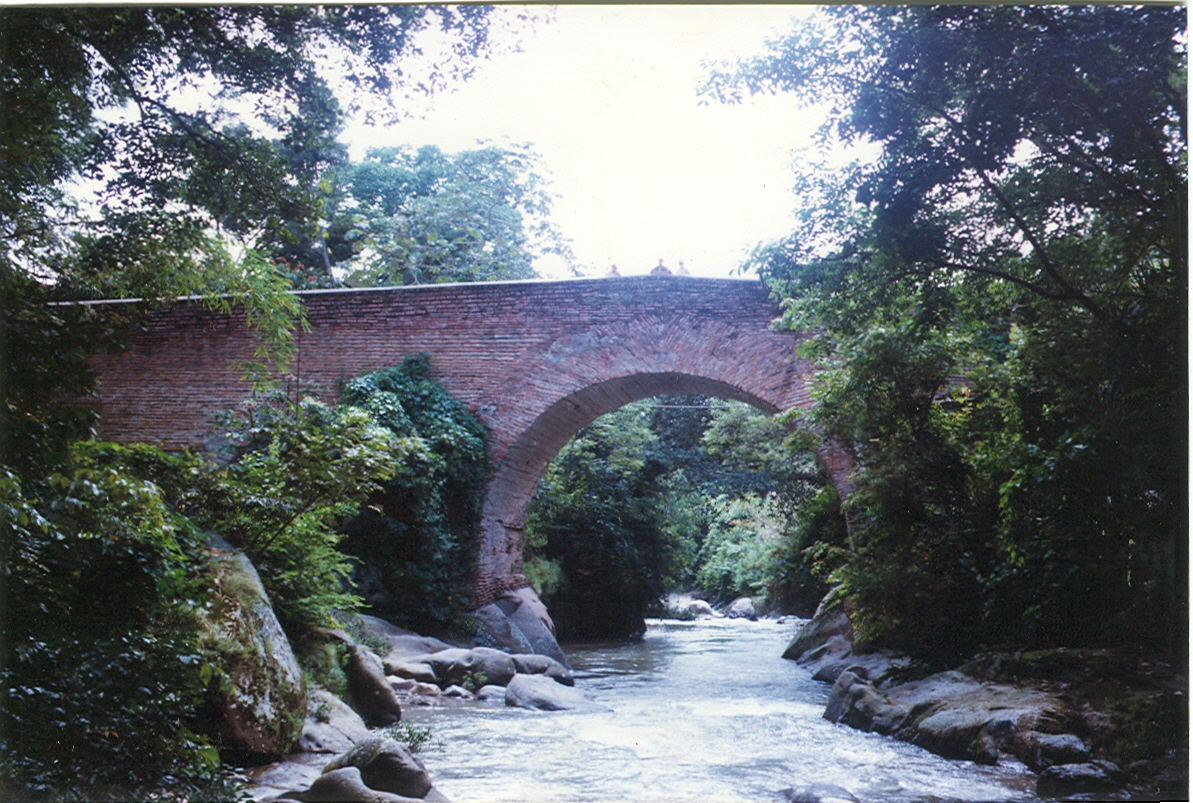
San Francisco Bridge

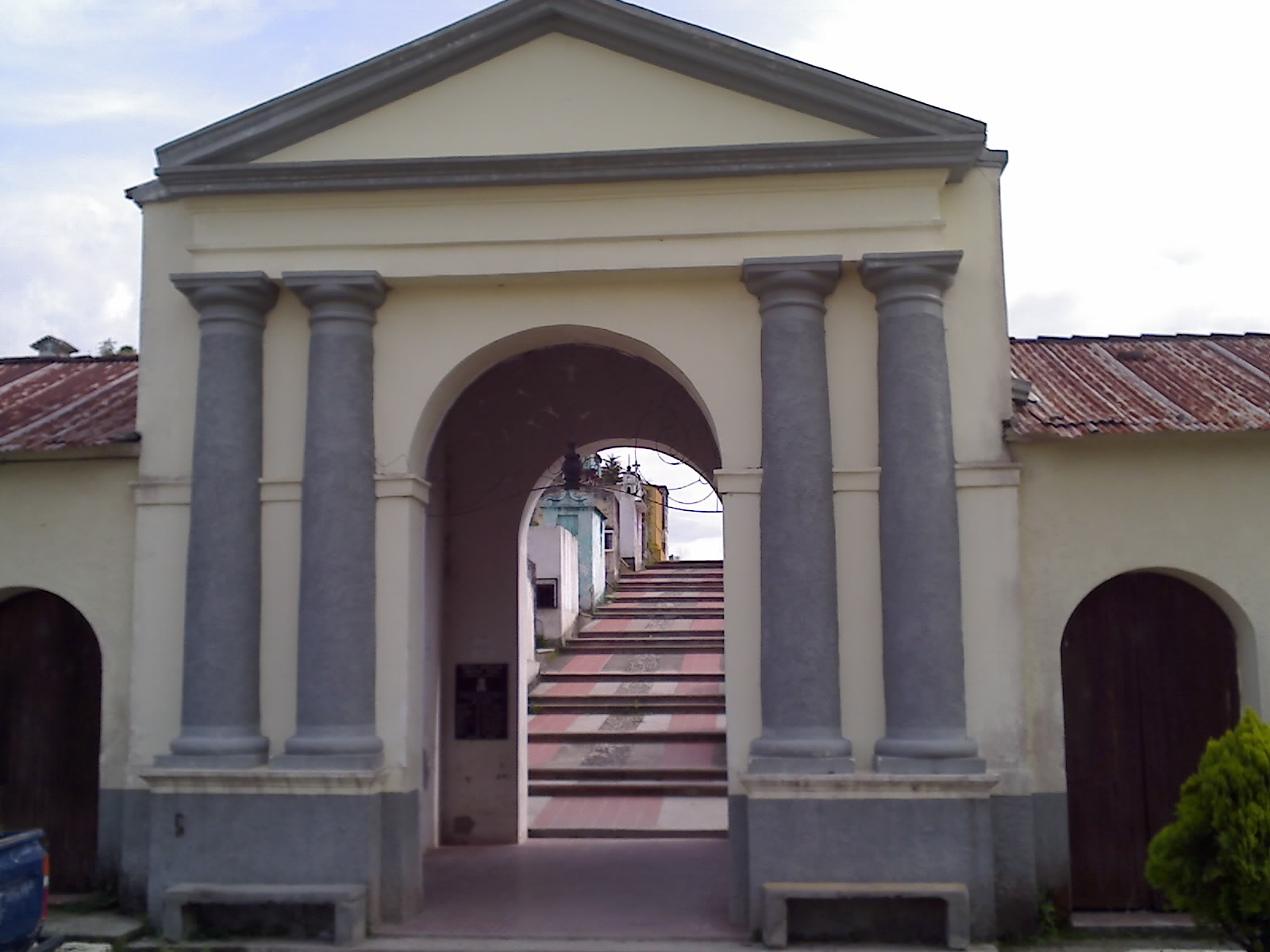
Santa Rosa Cemetery

=== Military ===
Honduras sought to modernize its national army, since by 1875 it was still very backward in all aspects compared to other nations. On April 22, 1881, by agreement of the Secretary of State in the war office, a military academy was created, under the direction of the French Civil and Military Engineer Héctor Galinier. In 1890, President Luis Bográn sent the Rector of the University and Director of the National Institute to Spain. Doctor Antonio Abad Ramírez Fontecha, to hire a Cultural Mission to come to Honduras to provide services at the university, colleges, schools of arts and crafts and Military School. The people hired to provide advice to the Military School were Engineer Lieutenant Morgado y Calvo, Francisco Cañizales Moyano and Juan Guillén Ruiz.

The founding of this military school was not an isolated event, since a process of military legislation had begun. The first Military Code was introduced in January 1881, also issuing the Regulations for Mandatory Military Service, the Law of Military Organizations and the Military Ordinance. Two ironclad steam warships, Tatumbla and 22 de Febrero were acquired in 1896. They were assembled at the Kiel shipyard in the German Empire. A formal navy was never established in the country despite the use of both steam and sail vessels.

=== Culture ===
In terms of culture, the European influence in Honduras promoted a new literary wave in the country, and there also began to be more interest in theater and opera. In terms of fashion, the upper classes began to adopt a lot of French fashion, especially among women, while men dressed more in the british style.

In terms of gender roles, although Honduras was always characterized as a very conservative country, after the reforms promoted by Marco Aurelio Soto women began to take a more prominent role in society; thanks to public schools many were able to study until hisghschool, up to university level. New generations of thinkers flourished in Honduras as new political theories came to the country, with new ways of understanding society and its socio-political issues. European authors gave rise to a flourishing of new ideologies.

== Consequences ==
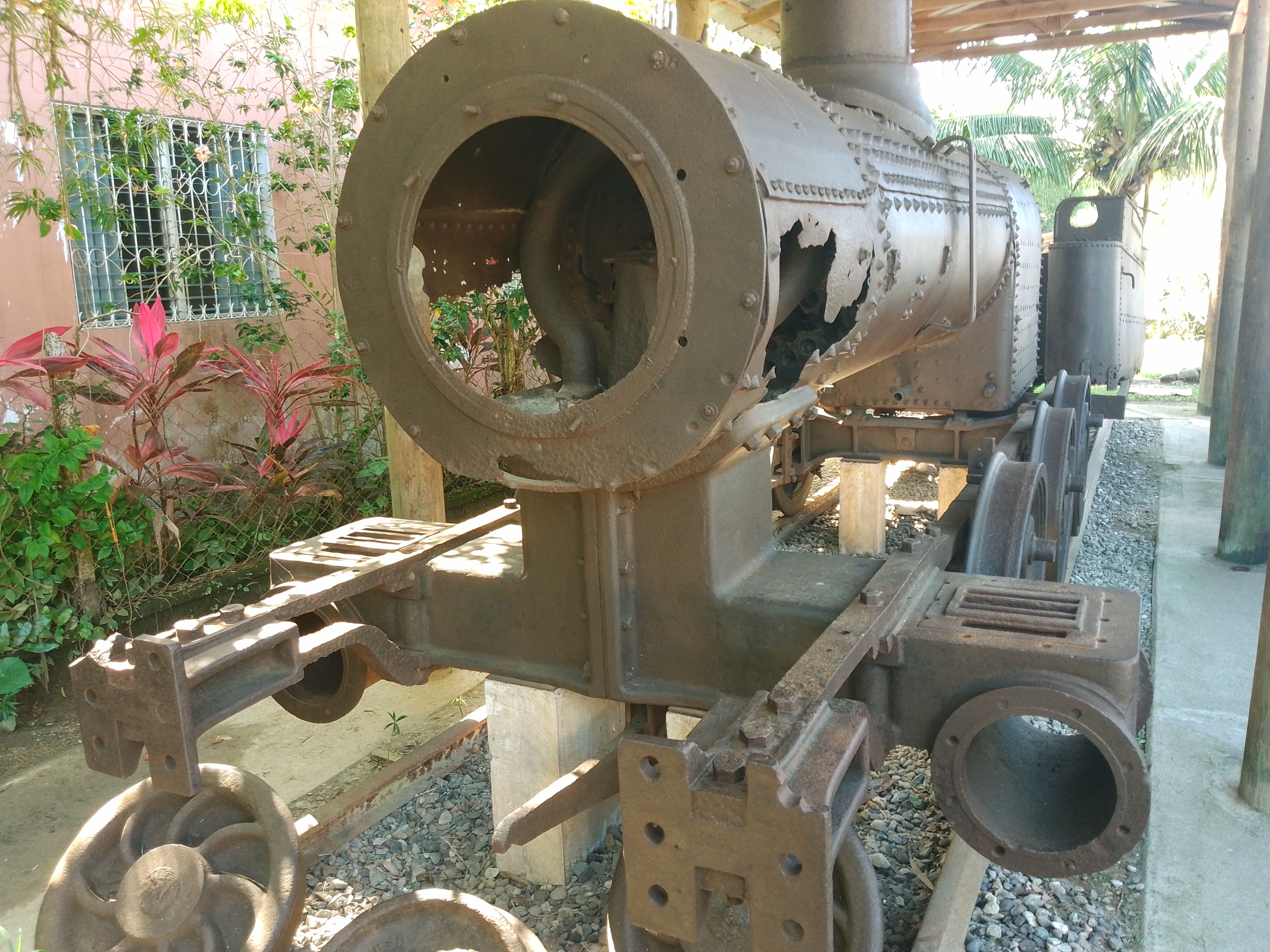
Oldest train still preserved in Honduras, dated from the late 19th century.

We cannot speak of the current Republic of Honduras as the current nation without first knowing the Liberal Reform and what repercussions it has had on the country, both in the 20th and 21st centuries. Some historians hold the Liberal Reform responsible for everything that Honduras is today, whether positive or negative. Among the positive aspects are:

- Openness to the world and friendship with neighboring countries and other states.
- Arrival of the Railroad, for use in transporting materials and passengers.
- Arrival of the automobile to the country.
- Improvement in the infrastructure and construction of railroads, bridges, hospitals, and schools.
- Arrival of new technologies to the country such as the telegraph, hydroelectric energy, and public lighting.
- New political thoughts and movements.
- Cultural and literary rebirth.
- Limitation of power and therefore the abuses of the Catholic Church.
- An economic growth in the country that allowed relative social and political stability from 1876 to 1903.
- Legalization of civil marriage.
- Decriminalization of homosexuality.
- Creation of the secular state.

== See also ==
- History of Honduras
