= Colombia–Japan relations =

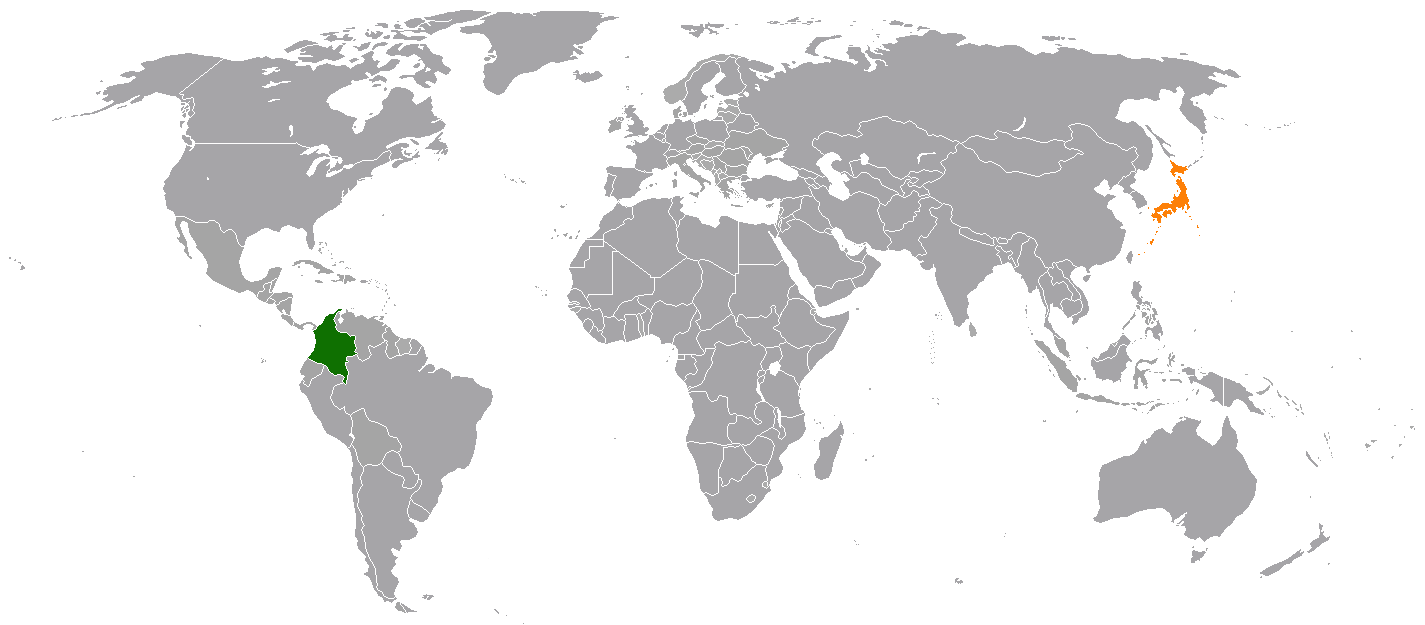
- Colombia: Japan

Colombia–Japan relations are the diplomatic relations between Colombia and Japan. The relationship was officially established in 1908. Relations are mostly based on commercial trade that has favored Japanese interests, cultural exchanges, and technological and philanthropic aid to Colombia.

== History ==
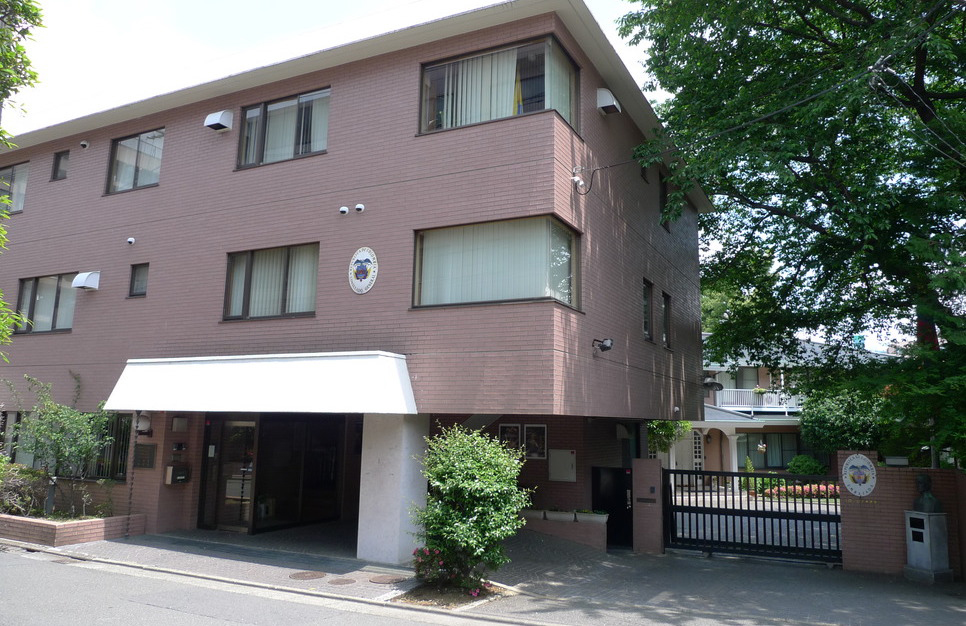
Embassy of Colombia in Tokyo

Diplomatic relations between Colombia and Japan were established in a treaty called Friendship, Commerce and Navigation signed in Washington, D.C., United States on May 25, 1908. However, the first official embassy was set up by Japan in Bogotá, Colombia in 1934; the following year, Colombia established its embassy in Tokyo.

== Economic relations ==
According to the Colombian embassy in Japan, commercial ties between the two countries are increasingly dynamic. In 1996, Japan became the third focus of Colombian imports after the United States and Venezuela with some US$722.5 million (5.6% of total Colombian imports). Japan on the other hand imported some US$348.6 million (less than 1% of Japanese imports).

Japanese products exported to Colombia are mostly assembled vehicles, auto parts, video cameras and communication devices, while Colombian products exported to Japan were mostly coffee, grains, and nickel, and on a minor scale emeralds, exotic reptile skins, and chocolate. Most recently flowers and leather products have also been exported. The relative low commercial exchange is due to Japan's geo-strategic interests in other Latin American countries such as Brazil (where it has an important number of established immigrants), Mexico, Chile, Peru and Argentina. For Colombian producers on the other hand exporting results highly expensive to send more products to Japan when other nearby countries represent more cost-efficient markets and have less economic restrictions. Cultural exports to Colombia mainly include video games, music (J-pop) and anime.

== Resident diplomatic missions ==
- Colombia has an embassy in Tokyo.
- Japan has an embassy in Bogotá.

== See also ==
- Foreign relations of Colombia
- Foreign relations of Japan
- Japanese Colombians
