= Japanese Canadian Sugar Beet Program =

Canadian WWII internment program (1942–45)

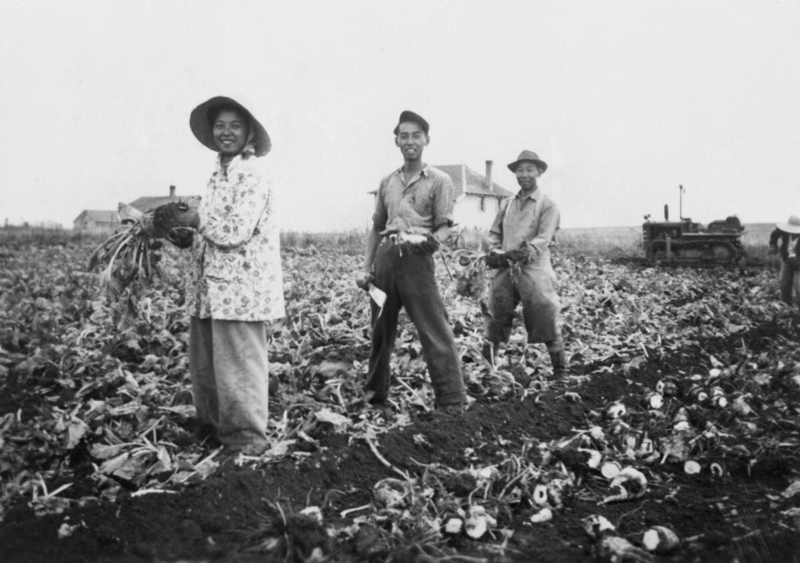
Japanese Canadians working in a sugar beet field in southern Alberta. Pictured left to right: Kaoru 'Betty' Nishiyama, Makio 'Mac' Nishiyama, and Kohei Nishiyama.

The Japanese Canadian Sugar Beet Program was initiated by the Government of British Columbia in March of 1942, and resulted in the relocation of approximately 3,600 Japanese Canadians to carceral sugar beet farms in Alberta and Manitoba. The Sugar Beet Program was part of a broader movement to intern and forcibly relocate Japanese Canadians during World War II after the bombing of Pearl Harbor in December of 1941. In Alberta and Manitoba, the Program was framed by governments as a cheap method of addressing wartime labour shortages in the industry, while in British Columbia it was seen as a means of ridding the Province of market competitors. On the farms, Japanese Canadians performed strenuous agricultural labour with minimal compensation. Living conditions were poor, as most shelters lacked running water and the insulation needed to withstand harsh prairie winters. While governments proposed the Program as voluntary and beneficial for the Japanese, those who chose to relocate from the west coast to the prairies were still subject to surveillance by the Royal Canadian Mounted Police and were forced to carry identification cards. The curtailing of civil liberties prompted acts of resistance, including strikes and petitions for improved working and living conditions. Following the end of World War II, many Japanese Canadians left the farms for urban centres in the prairies or moved east to Ontario. In 1949, the federal government lifted restrictions that had prevented Japanese Canadians from returning to British Columbia. However, few moved back to the coast. Decades later, in 1988, Brian Mulroney's conservative government issued a formal apology and redress package to affected Japanese Canadians. The package included reparations, pardons for those convicted under the War Measures Act, and the reinstatement of citizenship to those wrongfully deported and their descendants.

== Historical background ==
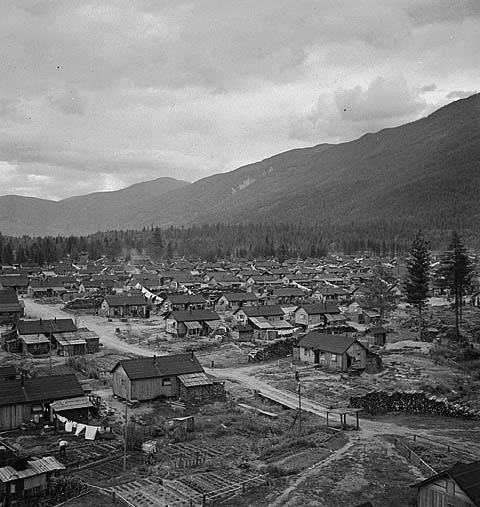
Japanese-Canadian internment camp in Lemon Creek, British Columbia.

Before the Pearl Harbor Attack in 1941, small Japanese settlements were present in Southern Alberta and Manitoba. During this period, the Japanese population in Alberta and Manitoba was approximately 578 and 50, respectively. Most had emigrated to the prairies in the early 20th century and had been farmers in Japan before arriving to Canada. Many also owned land. In contrast to the Japanese population that arrived to the prairies after 1941, the pre-existing population faced less discrimination, and they did not have their property seized from them by the Canadian government.

When Pearl Harbor was bombed on December 7, 1941, Canada declared war on Imperial Japan that same day. The event exacerbated pre-existing racial fears and hostilities directed at Japanese Canadians, especially in British Columbia. Citing issues of "national security," the Canadian federal government invoked the War Measures Act to remove nearly 22,000 Japanese Canadians outside a 100-mile (160-kilometre) Restricted Zone along the west coast of British Columbia, forcing them into internment camps in the Province's interior and beyond. In doing so, the federal government disregarded evidence from Canadian military officials and the RCMP stating that Japanese Canadians posed no threat to the nation. The governing body responsible for administering the forced removal of Japanese Canadians from the coast was the BC Securities Commission (BSSC). Created on February 27, 1941, the BSSC additionally oversaw the confiscation of Japanese Canadian properties and assets, including cameras, short-wave radios, and approximately 1,800 fishing boats. The internment camps resulted in the separation of families, as men were sent to work while women and children remained in the camps.

On March 28, 1942, the government of British Columbia announced the Sugar Beet Program. Initiated by the BSSC and made possible through partnerships with provincial and municipal governments in Manitoba and Alberta, the Program saw Albertan and Manitoban sugar beet farmers in need of cheap labour matched with Japanese families in need of work. The Program was regarded in the prairies as a solution to severe wartime labour shortages in the sugar beet industry, and it appealed to British Columbians who believed Japanese workers jeopardized the economic interests of whites in the Province. While it was technically voluntary, the Program used the threat of separating men from their wives and children to coerce Japanese Canadians into joining it. By participating in the Program, governments promised that Japanese families would remain together on the sugar beet farms, which would not have been the case had they remained in the internment camps.

== Relocation to sugar beet farms ==
Japanese Canadians relocated from British Columbia were matched with local hosts on sugar beet farms in Alberta and Manitoba. In total, 2588 were moved by railway to Alberta, and another 1053 were relocated to Manitoba. To incentivize sponsorship, the federal and provincial governments provided wage subsidies for host families and promoted the message that sponsorship displayed patriotism. As scholars have noted, the sugar beet program-- in contrast to the internment camps-- allowed Japanese Canadians to maintain the appearance of freedom. However, once on the farms, they were subject to a high degree of state surveillance. In 1943, the Canadian federal government's ability to control the Japanese Canadian population on the sugar beet farms increased with the passage of legislation that enabled RCMP monitoring, forced them to carry an identification card at all times, and prohibited them from traveling or changing jobs without a special permit. It is primarily for this reason that scholars argue that sugar beet farms served as carceral sites for Japanese Canadians during World War II.

=== Living conditions ===
Living conditions for Japanese Canadians on the farms were harsh, as many families faced severe material shortages. Before World War II, many sugar beet farm owners relied on single, itinerant men for labour. Housing for these men often consisted of barns or tar paper shacks with gaps between boards. It was into these structures that some Japanese Canadian families moved. In other instances, housing for the families was built from scratch. Regardless of the lodgings' origins, many Japanese Canadians lived in poorly constructed shelters lacking insulation, potable water, and proper heating, leaving them vulnerable to the region's harsh winters that could reach temperatures as low as −40 °C. Since most had migrated from British Columbia's west coast where winters were comparatively moderate, the prairie winters came as a shock to many. Houses were also isolated, small, and frequently overcrowded. Some local farmers provided guidance, but living and working conditions remained poor.

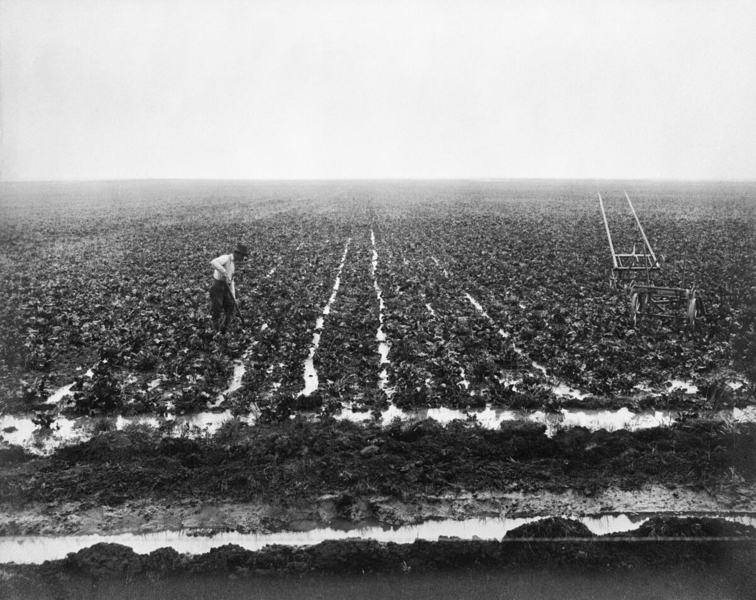
Field of sugar beets in Raymond, Alberta, 1941.

=== Working conditions ===
Working conditions on the farms were grueling, with long hours and minimal compensation. Wages were low, with Japanese Canadian sugar-beet farmers in Manitoba earning approximately 25 to 30 cents per hour on a piecework basis. By comparison, white workers earned $3–4 per hour for the same amount of labour. The Japanese Canadians were seen as desirable because their labour was cheap and they did not attempt to unionize, unlike the Eastern European workers before them. Employers preferred families with more men, however, women and children sometimes toiled on the farms. Due to the highly labour-intensive nature of the work, children often sacrificed their education to help their families with the sugar beet harvest. The unfamiliarity with farming added to the difficulties Japanese Canadians faced. Many of those relocated to Alberta had little to no prior experience in agriculture. A survey conducted at the time found that less than half of the Japanese Canadians who relocated from British Columbia to the prairies had prior experience with farming. Even if those relocated did have prior experience, however, it was unlikely to have been helpful due to the uniquely labour-intensive process of sugar beet production. While the soil for the beets was prepared using a horse-drawn plow, the rest of the production process was typically done by hand. Crops were manually thinned with a hoe multiple times over the course of one season to control weed growth. When it came time to harvest, workers began by removing beets from the soil by hand. Then, a second person would use a beet-hook (a device similar to a sickle) to remove the vegetable's leaves. Finally, beets would be manually shoveled into the back of a cart. Inclement weather conditions in the sugar beet fields were often challenging, as there was no reprieve from direct sunlight and high temperatures. Letters of correspondence obtained from the Japanese Canadian sugar beet farmers describe the difficulties associated with working in the prairie's climate, be it in the winter or summer months.

=== Economic impacts ===
The broader economic impact of Japanese Canadian labour was substantial. During the 1940s, the population made up a significant portion of the agricultural workforce in Alberta and Manitoba, particularly in sugar beet farming. By 1944, they comprised 50% of the industry's workforce in both provinces. Japanese Canadian labour generated at least $750,000 in industry revenues and boosted output by 65%. However, their exclusion from land ownership and the low wages they received meant that they saw little personal economic gain from their contributions.

=== Community ===
The presence of pre-existing Japanese residents in the area, along with a mix of religious traditions—including Buddhism, Christianity, Confucianism, and Mormonism—helped create a network of support. The municipality of Raymond in Southern Alberta had a large Mormon population that had previously faced religious persecution, fostering a somewhat more inclusive environment for the Japanese. Buddhism, in particular, became a central aspect of cultural identity among Japanese Canadians in the region.

== Activism and resistance ==
Japanese Canadians actively resisted discriminatory policies, advocating for equal rights alongside white Canadians. Acts of resistance included labor strikes, such as one on October 2, 1942, when two Japanese families in Manitoba successfully improved their living conditions by refusing to work. Japanese Canadian internally displaced persons (IDPs) also worked to raise awareness of human rights within their communities, negotiating with the British Columbia Security Commission (BCSC) and the Alberta Sugar Beet Growers’ Association (ASBGA) for better economic and living conditions while striving to retain their ethno-religious identity. Their advocacy to protect Buddhism highlights an early assertion of religious freedom by a marginalized group. During this period, they expanded their ethno-religious spaces, with Buddhism serving as a key foundation for maintaining and even strengthening their sense of ethnic community in the face of marginalization.

As activists, Japanese Canadian IDPs pursued equal rights through political negotiations with Canadian federal and provincial governments. In response to poor working and living conditions on the farms, as well as the restrictions on their freedom of movement, they appealed to the BCSC against the wishes of the ASBGA, demanding greater mobility and improved standards of living. They opposed policy changes that granted the ASBGA increased control over their movements and employment, arguing against these restrictions in meetings with both groups. Their complaints centered on the harsh limitations on their freedom of movement and the ASBGA's treatment of them primarily as a means of financial gain for the sugar beet industry. They concluded that resettlement in another region was the best solution. This strategy was effective. Since the ASBGA relied on Japanese labor to sustain the sugar beet industry, the Association was forced to grant concessions to retain workers. Some IDPs later leveraged this reliance at the end of the war to negotiate the right to remain in Alberta rather than be deported to Japan. The estimated loss to the sugar beet industry in Southern Alberta if the IDPs were relocated was approximately 50%.

Following the war, the ASBGA, despite its earlier opposition to the IDPs' demands, also advocated on their behalf in some instances. Seeking to retain its labor force, the ASBGA assisted IDPs in appealing for citizenship, engaging in discussions with both provincial and federal governments to support their case. This complex relationship between Japanese Canadian IDPs and the ASBGA highlights how economic interests at times intersected with advocacy efforts, ultimately contributing to the IDPs' long-term struggle for rights and recognition.

== Post-war developments ==
By the end of World War II in August 1945, many Japanese Canadian IDPs in Alberta and Manitoba moved to urban centers or relocated to Ontario, while others chose to remain on the farms. In 1949, the federal government lifted restrictions that had previously prevented Japanese Canadians from returning to British Columbia. However, only a few chose to move back, as the widespread dispossession and destruction of the Japanese Canadian community in British Columbia had left little to return to. Even after the war, many were unable to reclaim their confiscated property, further discouraging resettlement in their former homes. A 1987 study by the international accounting firm Price Waterhouse estimated real property loss from the Canadian government's seizure of Japanese properties at $50-million, and total economic loss at $443-million.

It was not until several decades later that the Canadian government formally acknowledged the injustices committed. On September 22, 1988, Prime Minister Brian Mulroney issued a formal apology on behalf of the government for the wrongful wartime treatment of Japanese Canadians. The apology was accompanied by a $300-million dollar redress package, which included $21,000 for each of the 13,000 survivors, $12-million for a Japanese community fund, and $24-million for the establishment of the Canadian Race Relations Foundation. The package also included pardons for those wrongfully convicted under the War Measures Act, and the reinstatement of citizenship for deported Japanese Canadians and their descendants.

== See also ==
- Anti-Japanese sentiment
- Canada-Japan relations
- Internment of Japanese Canadians
- Internment of Japanese Americans
- Nikkei Internment Memorial Centre
- Obasan
- Racism in Canada
