= Tashme Internment Camp =

- Location within British Columbia Location within Canada
- 49°16′28″N 121°14′58″W
- Location: Sunshine Valley, British Columbia

History
- Founded: 1942
- Demolished: 1946

Site notes
- Area: 600 acres (240 ha)

The Tashme Internment Camp (/ˈtæʒmɪ/ [Anglicized pronunciation] or /ˈtɑːʃɪmɪ/ [Japanese pronunciation]) was a purpose-built internment camp constructed to forcibly detain people of Japanese ancestry living on the west coast of Canada during World War II after the attack on Pearl Harbor.

Located at the current unincorporated community of Sunshine Valley, east of Hope in British Columbia, Canada, Tashme was operational between 1942 and 1946 and had a peak population of 2,624 people to 2,636 people. Tashme was constructed on 600 acres of leased land for $500/year on the A.B. Trites Farm.

== Etymology ==
Tashme was previously called Fourteen Mile Ranch, a dairy and livestock farm of Amos B. Trites. From there, the name was changed by the British Columbia Securities Commission (BCSC) so that it could be recognized as a mailing address. The name Tashme was created by combining the first two letters of the last names of three men who worked for the BCSC, a now-obsolete branch of the provincial government. Taylor Shirras and Mead, after Austin Taylor, John Shirras, and Frederick Mead.

Although it "sounds like it could be a Japanese word", the name proved difficult to pronounce for Japanese-speaking inhabitants as the short /sh/ sound without the vowel /i/ following it is not seen in the Japanese language. In English the name is commonly pronounced tahj-mi, versus the Japanese pronunciation of ta-shi-mi.

== History ==
=== Background ===
Since the 1860s, Japanese people had settled in British Columbia, working as lumbers or fishermen on the coast while facing racial struggles to be accepted in a predominantly white culture. In 1941, the government recorded 13,000 Nisei, second-generation Japanese Canadians. Most Nisei were living in the Downtown east side, known as Japantown. In the heart of Japantown, on Oppenheimer Park, they would form a historical baseball team that influenced the Vancouver baseball culture (see also: Asahi).

The internment of Japanese Canadians was initiated from fears of Japanese forces after the attack on Pearl Harbor in 1941. In the first few months of 1942, the hate against Nisei peaked, and racist stances against Japanese Canadians became hard to endure. Nevertheless, under Prime Minister Mackenzie King, the government issued an "Order-in-Council PC 1486" for "national security reasons". The legislation was to remove "all persons of Japanese Racial Origin" from 100 miles far from the BC west coast to the interior lands. The Japanese internment was one of Canadian history's worst violations of freedom. The BCSC fixed the power for the Royal Canadian Mounted Police (RCMP) to remove Japanese Canadians from their home forcefully, set dusk-to-dawn curfews, and confiscate personal properties.

The camp was notable as the temporary home of celebrated Canadian artist Kazuo Nakamura, who suffered from the same abuses and confiscation as other inmates. Camp staff strongly disapproved of free artistic expression, and would often destroy or remove work by Nakamura. Like other young Japanese men, Nakamura was assigned to woodcutting work, and only provided an elementary education. To pass the time and ensure his content passed harsh censorship, Nakamura took to imitating and tracing books of Canadian art available through a Christian mission in Tashme. His works from this time are largely concerned with landscape scenes.

=== Creation ===
Tashme was the largest Japanese-Canadian internment camp in British Columbia. The site chosen for Tashme was 22 km southeast of the village of Hope and on the border of the 100-mile coastal exclusion zone. In addition to its position outside of the coastal exclusion zone, this location was chosen because it was a large enough property to fit the 500 families that the government anticipated would stay there. As it was a dairy and livestock farm, it also had many already constructed farm amenities, such as the horse stable, pig barns, blacksmith's and metal shops. It was surrounded by the Cascade Mountains in a picturesque but isolated setting. In July 1942, the Tashme Internment Camp opened for Japanese Canadians. Nisei were forced into unsanitary shacks and were pressured to construct houses starting in 1942. The camp was designed to house the families of men employed to work on constructing the Hope–Princeton highway, and was one of several road camps.

Tashme was the only internment site that was built for the purpose of Japanese Canadian internment, while the other sites were in ghost towns or villages. Interned Japanese Canadian men were taken from Hastings Park to build Tashme before other internees moved in. Construction on the site began in 1942 and, like other internment sites, Tashme was constructed hastily with limited materials, leading to a difficult first winter. Accounts of the winter of 1942–1943 are that it was particularly cold with heavy snowfall. Even after the war, Japanese Canadians were banned from returning home from the internment camps until 1949, and further, their homes were sold at bargain basement prices by the government.

=== Dismantling ===
Tashme, as an internment camp, closed on 26 August 1946, a year after World War II ended, and was fully dismantled in October 1946. The Canadian government encouraged Niseis to either move east of the Rocky Mountains or move to Japan. With no home to return to, most Nisei chose repatriation, though they were foreigners in the eyes of citizens in Japan. All Japanese Canadians who chose repatriation were collected in Tashme and were forcefully sent to Japan. The internment of Japanese Canadians was the government's response to the public pressure against the Japanese race during the heightened hate against the Japanese force during the war.

== Camp conditions and facilities ==
=== Housing ===
Internees at Tashme were mainly housed in quickly-constructed tarpaper. There were 347 shacks, each approximately 4.3 by 8.5 metres (14 ft × 28 ft). 1–2 families, or up to 8 people, would stay in one shack. The undried, green timber that was milled quickly to construct the cabins shrunk as it dried, creating drafts in the tarpaper shacks. Green timber was also provided as firewood, but it was difficult to light. When a fire was lit inside the shack, more water was drawn out from the green timber of the walls and would freeze after the fire went out. These houses were laid out on 10 avenues, with around 30 houses on each avenue, and every four houses would share a common outdoor tap as well as an outhouse. The tar paper shacks each contained a kitchen-living area with a bedroom on either side. No doors were permitted in the shacks, so curtains were used.

In the kitchen was a round wood stove, the source of heating for the shacks. There was no electricity inside the tar paper shacks, so kerosene lamps were used as indoor lighting. In apartments, stores, and other essential buildings, there was electricity. Water was supplied through pipes from the Sumallo River.

Some barns that were on the property were also used as housing. One of the barns was turned into an apartment with two floors and 38 suites, and one kitchen on each floor. A sheep barn was used to house single men.

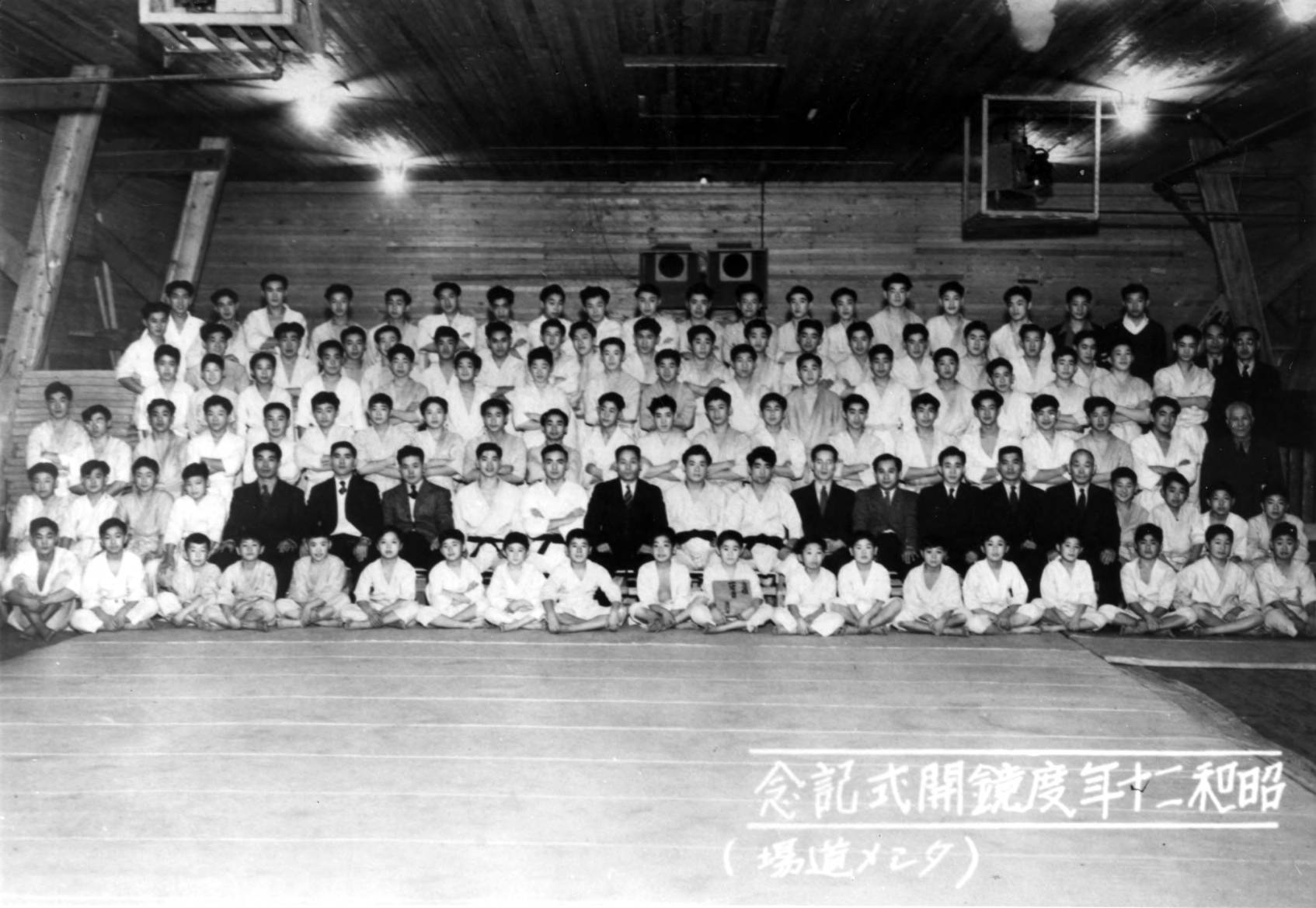
Japanese Canadian judoka celebrating kagami biraki in the gymnasium at the Tashme Internment Camp (1945). The suited man in the centre appears to be Shigetaka Sasaki

=== Services, resources, and organizations ===
Later, many services and resources were established including a soy sauce and miso factory, bakery, shoe repair shop, butcher shop, logging camp, schools, a 50-bed hospital, a post office, livestock farm, large garden, general store, powerhouse, RCMP detachment, and mess hall. While families cooked and ate by themselves, the single men and non-Japanese staff or RCMP officers had meals on separate ends of the mess hall, divided by a kitchen in the centre. There was also a boy scouts group, which was said to be the largest boy scouts troop in the British Empire of that era. In addition, there was a Girl Guides group, a Tashme Youth Organization, Judo club, and students council.

Buildings in Tashme that were converted from barns were given the names of A, B, C, and D buildings. The B and C buildings were used as housing or apartments, while the D and A buildings were used for schooling and as a community hall. The D building was divided into sections for schooling, carpentry, meetings, and community space, while on the weekends it was used as an auditorium. The RCMP detachment, bakery, powerhouse, and other small buildings were next to the town centre, which contained the BCSC offices as well as a general store and a warehouse.

On December 7, 1942, the Shinwa-kai (Japanese council) was developed. This was a group of about 8 men that organized the Japanese community affairs at Tashme and distributed news flashes.

=== Education ===
There was an elementary school that was created and operated by the BCSC, Japanese Canadian internees at Tashme, and other organizations. The Federal government provided course materials and teachers for students of grades 1–8, while the provincial government declined to provide any assistance. Following requests to the BCSC in 1942 from the parent teacher association for a high school to be provided, after the request was declined by the government, the Women's Missionary Society of the United Church of Canada (UCCan) later organized for a high school to operate in 1943. The high school classes were run in the same building as the elementary school and due to the fact that the elementary school ran from 9:30 am to 3:30 pm, the high school had to run from 3:30 to 9:30 pm.

There were four missionaries that taught academic courses, receiving $75 each month; while six Japanese teachers taught commercial courses, volunteering their time for the high school students after teaching the elementary students during the day. The students did the maintenance work for the school. In academics, the students were taught English literature, grammar, social studies, health, math, science, Latin, and French; while in the commercial courses students were taught shorthand, typing, home economics, arts, and bookkeeping.

The high school students had to pay an additional $9 per course on top of the $2 that other British Columbian high schoolers had to pay. The schools ran on Monday through Thursday, with Friday as a day off and Saturday as a day to worship, be social, and in the afternoon, listen to music. The Anglican Church managed a kindergarten that had 120 students, run by two missionaries and two Japanese Canadians. The teachers at the elementary schools were mainly recruited Japanese Canadians from Tashme, most of whom were recent graduates.

The school followed the curriculum of the BC Department of Education. The school opened on January 26, 1943, as well as the hospital. The school had 629 students in grades 1–9 enrolled and 30 teachers. The schools were operated in milking and stock barns which previously had been used to house single men and were intended to be converted back to barns after the war, so many of the barn fixtures and appliances were not removed while the schools operated. The Vancouver school board donated used textbooks, desks, and equipment.

== Employment ==
After more establishments were built at Tashme, more jobs were available. Internees worked for the BCSC at offices, the hospital, schools, as shop workers, and as municipal service workers. Tashme also had livestock barns and vegetable gardens where people could work. Men were hired at the Tashme sawmill, making materials that would be used to build housing and other buildings. Later, another sawmill a few miles away from Tashme hired other internees, offering higher wages than that of the Tashme sawmill. Men 16–20 years old worked on logging trucks, and other younger men worked in businesses in Tashme, having to leave work at 3:00 pm to attend their highschool classes.

The opening of the shoyu and miso factory in Tashme 1943 generated more jobs for internees. The factory supplied Tashme as well as other internment camps and Japanese Canadians outside of the coastal exclusion zone. The BCSC opened the factory, and the operations and workers were organized by Mr. Shinichi Negoro.

Some Japanese Canadian internees were unable to work, and because their houses and jobs had been taken away due to the war, they were supplied with welfare by the BCSC. The people that received welfare were those who were unable to earn sufficient money, the elderly, single parents, the injured or sick, or people who did not have the physical ability required. Financial help was provided, as well as clothes, food, and housing. In Tashme, they had a welfare department with a manager and Japanese Canadian workers. This department worked with families and ensured that people received the standard relief rate for BC and their specific situation.

=== Hope–Princeton Highway ===
Japanese Canadian men who were between the ages of 18 to 45 and lived inside the coastal exclusion zone were sent to work camps in the BC Interior to do work creating roads for the Federal Department of Mines and Resources. One of these work camps was the construction of the Hope–Princeton Highway. Over 1000 men, living in 5 different road camps, worked on the Hope–Princeton Highway, many of whom had families in Tashme. In 1943, due to changed regulations, the men joined their families at the internment camps.

The interned Japanese Canadians were employed by the BCSC and the Federal Department of Labour. Most Japanese Canadian internees that were not specialists were paid $0.25 per hour, and road camp workers were paid $0.35. The average wage at the time in Canada was $0.62 per hour for men and $0.37 per hour for women.

== Closure ==
Tashme was the first internment camp that was scheduled to close after the war, and by June 1946, families began to leave to find work in other provinces. In August 1946, Tashme officially closed, although some families stayed behind to clean up the location for the owners. The last family left in October 1946. This was the family of Shinichi Negoro, the organizer of the shoyu and miso factory. Shinichi Negoro, in addition to other entrepreneurial Japanese Canadian families, planned to open a shoyu and miso factory in Ashcroft. While internees were in the process of being deported to Japan, and the Tashme factory was decommissioned, the Negoro family were processing the raw supplies left over from the Tashme factory to move to their new factory. They left in early November 1946.

=== "Repatriation" ===
In 1942, when the Japanese Canadians were removed from the coastal exclusion zone, Ian Mackenzie decided that the Japanese posed a threat to British Columbia, even if there was no war. This opinion quickly spread to other anti-Japanese leaders in BC, but between provinces and groups, there were conflicting and mixed opinions on what should be done with the Japanese in Canada. The Consultative Council for Cooperation in Wartime Problems of Canadian Citizenship and Ottawa shared ideas that opposed that of BC's. The Consultative Council suggested that the Japanese Canadians that were proven as not disloyal be dispersed throughout Canada rather than deported.

In 1943, many groups wanted to employ policies on Japanese Canadians similar to the American government's for Japanese Americans. This involved a survey in which Japanese Canadians would have to declare their loyalty to Canada and deny loyalty to Japan. If they did not sign the survey or if they were deemed disloyal to Canada, they would be put into a separate camp and deported following the end of the war.

In 1944, the deportation and rights of Japanese Canadians were still being debated. The Canadian government, wanting to quickly deport as many Japanese Canadians as possible and send the rest throughout Canada, hurriedly made the choice to send out repatriation surveys. Those who chose repatriation were seen as disloyal, and if they did not, they were additionally tested with a loyalty commission. The process of the repatriation survey was created to confuse inmates into choosing to go to Japan. They were given the choice to either repatriate to Japan at an unknown date, or to immediately move east of the coastal exclusion zone with no promise of permanency. If they chose repatriation to Japan, they were also able to stay and work in BC until they left, and were to be given in Japan the equivalent of the funds that they had in Canada. The government chose to refer to this deportation as repatriation, which means to move back to one's country of origin. This was ironic because many of the interned Japanese Canadians were born in Canada, so Japan was not their country of origin.

After the war ended in 1945, Japanese Canadians were still not allowed in the "coastal exclusion zone", and this continued until 1949. The internees were further incentivized to go to Japan rather than move further east into Canada, which was an unfamiliar place for many Japanese Canadians. For example, some cities did not accept any Japanese Canadians, although legally these municipal councils did not have the power to refuse any Canadian citizens entry into their cities.

During this time, Tashme was used as one of three locations where Japanese Canadians were sent to wait for ships that would arrive in Vancouver to take them to Japan. By December 1946, around 4000 Japanese Canadians were deported to Japan.
