= Internment of Japanese Canadians =

Period of internment of Japanese people in Canada

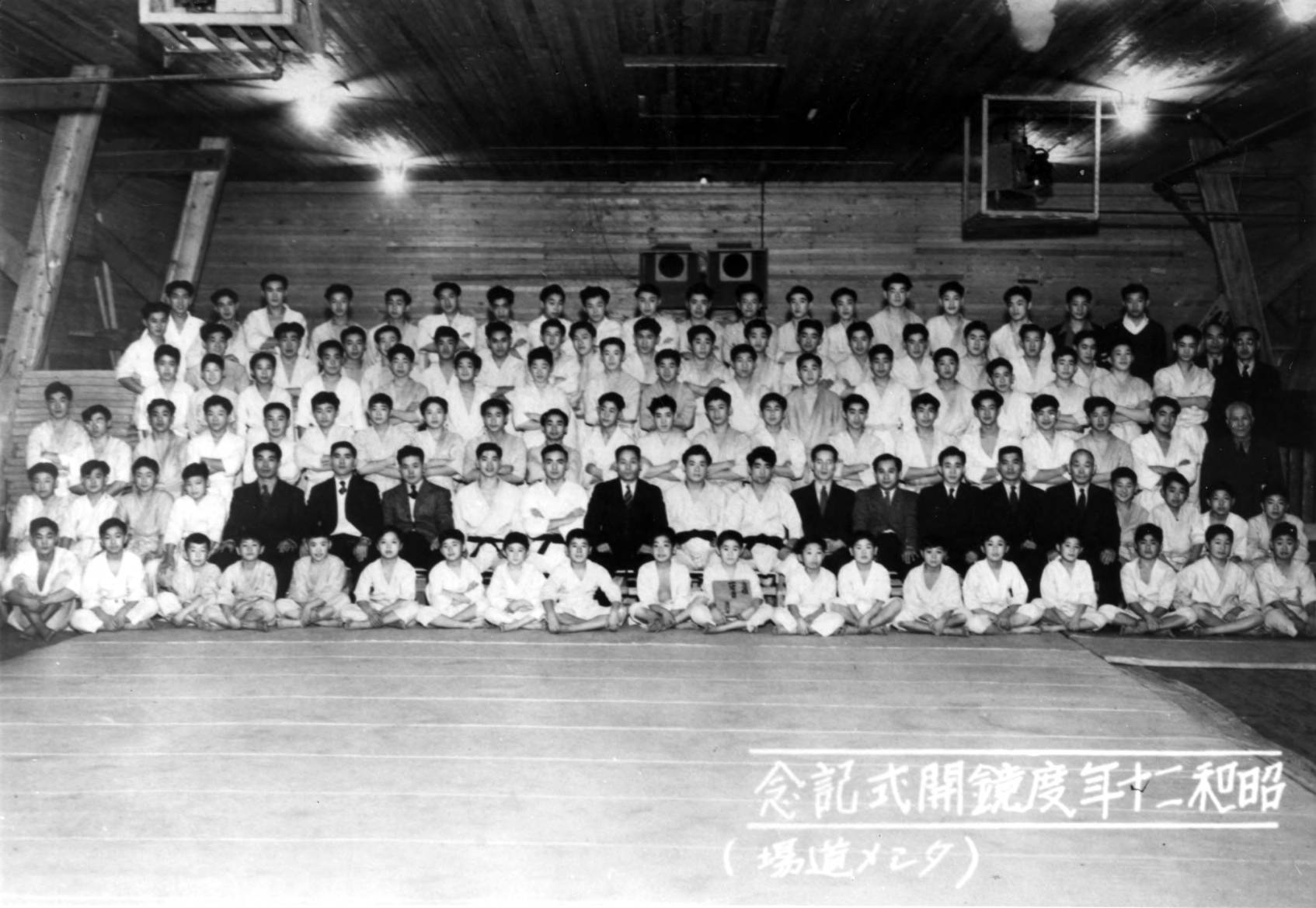
- Japanese-Canadian judoka celebrating kagami biraki in the gymnasium at the Tashme Internment Camp in BC, 1945. The suited man in the centre appears to be Shigetaka Sasaki.
- Date: January 14, 1942 – April 1, 1949
- Location: British Columbia, Canada; BC Interior; Hastings Park; Okanagan Valley; Tashme
- Motive: Hysteria after attack on Pearl Harbor and fall of Singapore; Anti-Japanese racism
- Perpetrator: Canadian federal government
- Outcome: Financial reparations given to surviving victims in 1988, reinstatement of citizenship for deported surviving victims
- Deaths: At least 107; at least 6 homicides by sentries
- Displaced: Over 22,000 Japanese Canadians
- Enabling laws: War Measures Act; Defence of Canada Regulations; Reference re Persons of Japanese Race
- Types of sites: Internment camps; Road camps; Prisoner-of-war camps; Sugar beet farms; Labour camps; Self-supporting projects

From 1942 to 1949, Canada forcibly relocated and interned over 22,000 Japanese Canadians—comprising over 90% of the total Japanese Canadian population—from British Columbia on the grounds of national security. The majority were Canadian citizens by birth and were targeted based on their ancestry. This decision followed the events of the Empire of Japan's war in the Pacific against the Western Allies, such as the invasion of Hong Kong, the attack on Pearl Harbor in Hawaii, and the Fall of Singapore which led to the Canadian declaration of war on Japan during World War II. Similar to the actions taken against Japanese Americans in neighbouring United States, Japanese Canadians were also subjected to government-enforced curfews and interrogations, job and property losses, and forced repatriation to Japan.

From shortly after the December 1941 attack on Pearl Harbor until 1949, Japanese Canadians were stripped of their homes and businesses, then sent to internment camps and farms in British Columbia as well as other parts of Canada, mostly towards the interior. The internees had their property seized and sold, including houses, farms, businesses, fishing boats, motor vehicles and personal belongings. The proceeds of these sales were used to pay for their basic needs of the internees during the internment.

In August 1944, Prime Minister William Lyon Mackenzie King announced that Japanese Canadians were to be moved east out of the British Columbia Interior. The official policy stated that Japanese Canadians must move east of the Rocky Mountains or be deported to Japan following the end of the war. By 1947, many Japanese Canadians had been granted exemption to enter the no-entry zone. It was not until April 1, 1949, that all Japanese Canadians were granted freedom of movement and could re-enter the "protected zone" along British Columbia's coast.

On September 22, 1988, Prime Minister Brian Mulroney delivered an apology, and the Canadian government announced a compensation package, one month after President Ronald Reagan made similar gestures in the United States following the internment of Japanese Americans. The package for interned Japanese Canadians included $21,000 to each surviving internee, and the reinstatement of Canadian citizenship to those who were deported to Japan. Following Mulroney's apology, the Japanese Canadian Redress Agreement was established in 1988, along with the Japanese Canadian Redress Foundation (JCRF; 1988–2002), to issue redress payments for internment victims, with the intent of funding education.

== Prewar history ==
=== Early settlement ===
The tension between Canadians and Japanese immigrants to Canada existed long before the outbreak of World War II. Starting as early as 1858 with the influx of Asian immigrants during the Fraser Canyon Gold Rush, beliefs and fears about Asian immigrants began to affect the populace in British Columbia (BC).

Canadian sociologist Forrest La Violette reported in the 1940s that these early sentiments had often been "organized around the fear of an assumed low standard of living [and] out of fear of Oriental cultural and racial differences." It was a common prejudiced belief within British Columbia that both Japanese and Chinese immigrants were stealing jobs away from white Canadians. Canadian academic Charles H. Young concluded that many Canadians argued based on this fear that "Oriental labour lowers the standard of living of White groups." It was also argued that Asian immigrants were content with a lower standard of living. The argument was that many Chinese and Japanese immigrants in BC lived in unsanitary conditions and were not inclined to improve their living space, thereby proving their inferiority and their unwillingness to become truly Canadian. Violette refuted this claim by stating that, while Japanese and Chinese immigrants did often have poor living conditions, both of the groups were hindered in their attempt to assimilate due to the difficulty they had in finding steady work at equal wages.

In reference to Japanese Canadians specifically, human geographer Audrey Kobayashi argues that prior to the war, racism "had defined their communities since the first immigrants arrived in the 1870s." Starting in 1877 with Manzo Nagano—a 19-year-old sailor who was the first Japanese person to officially immigrate to Canada, and entering the salmon-exporting business—the Japanese were quick to integrate themselves into Canadian industries. Some European-descended Canadians felt that, while the Chinese were content with being "confined to a few industries", the Japanese were infiltrating all areas of industry and competing with white workers. This sense of unease among white Canadians was worsened by the growing rate of Japanese fishermen in the early 1900s.

Japanese immigrants were also accused of being resistant to assimilation into British Canadian society, because of Japanese-language schools, Buddhist temples, and low intermarriage rates, among other examples. It was asserted that the Japanese had their own manner of living, and that many who had become naturalized in Canada did so to obtain fishing licences rather than out of a desire to become Canadian. These arguments reinforced the idea that the Japanese remained strictly loyal to Japan.

=== 1907 riots ===
The situation was exacerbated when, in 1907, the United States began prohibiting Japanese immigrants from accessing the mainland US through Hawaii, resulting in a massive influx (over 7,000 as compared to 2,042 in 1906) of Japanese immigrants into British Columbia. Largely as a result, on August 12 that year, a group of Vancouver labourers formed an anti-Asiatic league, known as the Asiatic Exclusion League, with its membership numbering "over five hundred". On September 7, some 5,000 people marched on Vancouver City Hall in support of the League, where they had arranged a meeting with presentations from both local and American speakers. By the time of the meeting, it was estimated that at least 25,000 people had arrived at the City Hall and, following the speakers, the crowd broke out in rioting, marching into Chinatown and Japantown.

The rioters stormed through Chinatown first, breaking windows and smashing store fronts. Afterwards, the rioters turned to the Japanese-Canadian neighbourhood. Alerted by the previous rioting, Japanese Canadians in Little Tokyo were able to repel the mob without any serious injury or loss of life. After the riot, the League and other nativist groups used their influence to push the government into an arrangement similar to the United States' Gentlemen's Agreement, limiting the number of passports given to male Japanese immigrants to 400 per year. Women were not counted toward the quota, so "picture brides", women who married by proxy and immigrated to Canada to join (and in many cases, meet for the first time) their new husbands, became common after 1908. The influx of female immigrants—and soon after, Canadian-born children—shifted the population from a temporary workforce to a permanent presence, and Japanese-Canadian family groups settled throughout British Columbia and southern Alberta.

The historian Michiko Midge Ayukawa argued that the experiences of Japanese picture brides were shaped by the Meiji-era ideal image of the “good wife and wise mother,” but also by migration, labor both paid and unpaid, racial discrimination, economic difficulties, and decisions of women. These experiences showed how gender roles within Japanese Canadian families were already being negotiated even before World War 2, as opposed to being fixed.

=== World War I (1914–18) ===
Japan during World War I was an ally of the United Kingdom and opinions of Japanese Canadians improved slightly. Some Japanese Canadians enlisted in the Canadian Forces. On the home front, many businesses began hiring groups that had been underrepresented in the workforce (including women, Japanese immigrants, and Yugoslavian and Italian refugees who had fled to Canada during the war) to help fill the increasing demands of Britain and its allies overseas. Businesses that had previously been opposed to doing so were now more than happy to hire Japanese Canadians as there was "more than enough work for all". However, by the end of the war, soldiers returning home to find their jobs filled by others, including Japanese immigrants, were outraged. While they had been fighting in Europe, the Japanese had established themselves securely in many business and were now, more than ever, perceived as a threat to white workers. "'Patriotism' and 'Exclusion' became the watchwords of the day."

=== Interwar years (1919–39) ===
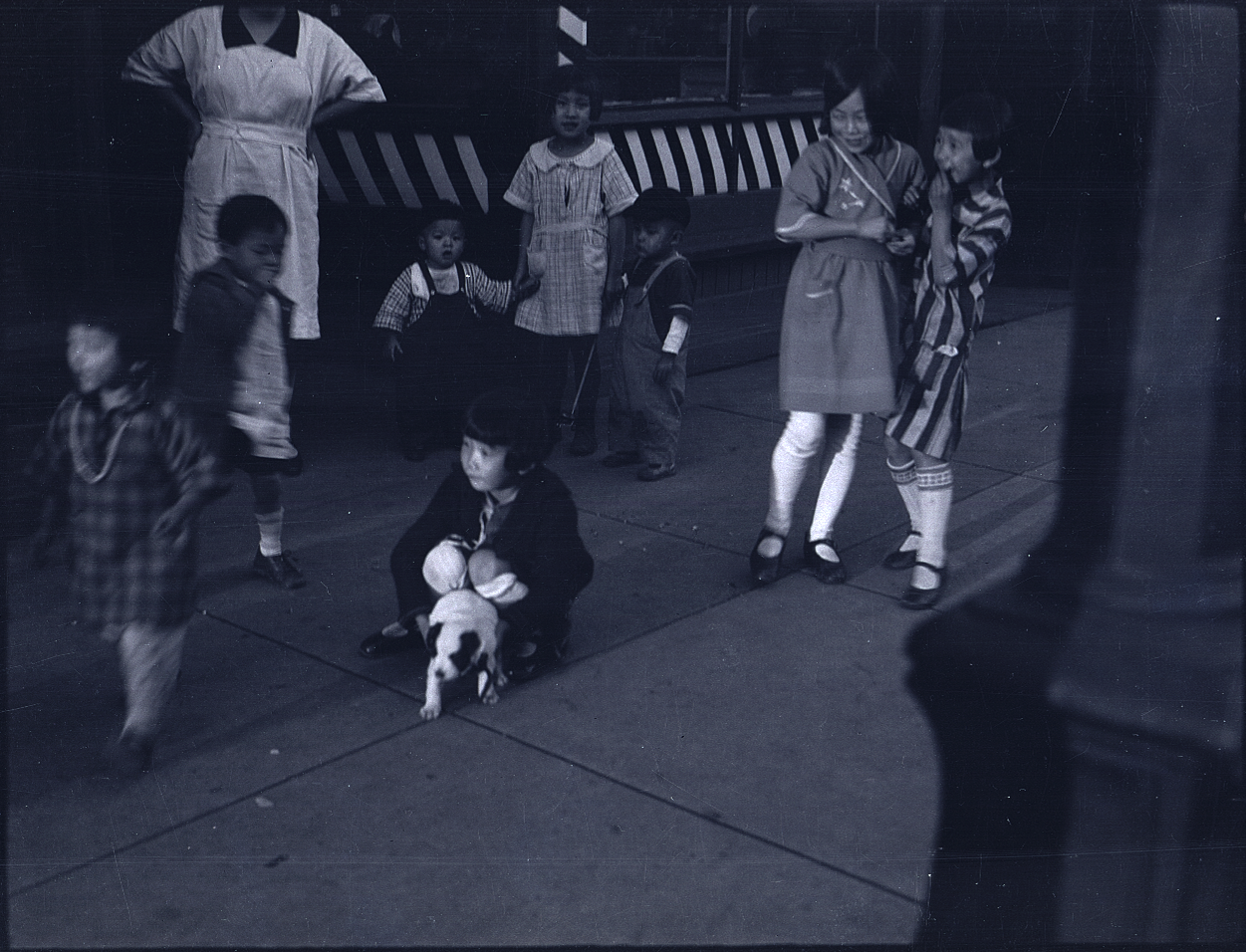
Japanese Canadian children on the sidewalk, Vancouver, British Columbia, 1927.

In 1919, 3,267 Japanese immigrants held fishing licences and 50% of the total licences issued that year were issued to Japanese fishermen. These numbers were alarming to European-descended Canadian fishermen who felt threatened by the growing number of Japanese competitors.

While groups like the Asiatic Exclusion League and the White Canada Association viewed Japanese Canadians as cultural and economic threats, by the 1920s, other groups had begun to come forward to the defence of Japanese Canadians, such as the Japan Society. In contrast to rival groups' memberships consisting of mostly labourers, farmers, and fishermen, the Japan Society was primarily made up of wealthy white businessmen whose goal was to improve relations between the Japanese and Canadians both at home and abroad. The heads of the organization included a "prominent banker of Vancouver" and a "manager of some of the largest lumbering companies in British Columbia". They saw Japanese Canadians as being important partners in helping to open Japanese markets to businesses in British Columbia.

Despite the work of organizations like the Japan Society, many groups still opposed Japanese immigration to Canada, especially in BC's fishing industry during the 1920s and 1930s. Prior to the 1920s, many Japanese labourers were employed as pullers, a job that required them to help the net men row the boats out to fish. The job required no licence, so it was one of the few jobs for first-generation Japanese immigrants who were not Canadian citizens. In 1923, however, the government lifted a ban on the use of motorboats and required that pullers be licensed. This meant that first-generation immigrants, known as Issei, were unable to get jobs in the fishing industry, which resulted in large–scale unemployment among these Issei. Second-generation Japanese Canadians, known as Nisei, and who were born in Canada, began entering the fishing industry at a younger age to compensate for this, but even they were hindered as the increased use of motorboats resulted in less need for pullers and only a small number of fishing licences were issued to Japanese Canadians.

This situation escalated in May 1938, when the Governor General abolished the puller licence entirely despite Japanese-Canadian protests. This resulted in many younger Japanese Canadians being forced from the fishing industry, leaving Japanese-Canadian net men to fend for themselves. Later that year, in August, a change to the borders of fishing districts in the area resulted in the loss of licences for several Japanese-Canadian fishermen, who claimed they had not been informed of the change. While these events did result in reduced competition from Japanese Canadians in the fishing industry, it created further tensions elsewhere.

Japanese Canadians had already been able to establish a secure position in many businesses during World War I, but their numbers had remained relatively small as many had remained in the fishing industry. As Japanese Canadians began to be pushed out of the fishing industry, they increasingly began to work on farms and in small businesses. This outward move into farming and business was viewed as more evidence of the economic threat Japanese Canadians posed towards white Canadians, leading to increased racial tension.

In the years leading up to World War II, approximately 29,000 people of Japanese ancestry lived in British Columbia; 80% of these were Canadian nationals. At the time, they were denied the right to vote and barred by law from various professions. Racial tensions often stemmed from the belief of many Canadians that all Japanese immigrants, both first-generation Issei and second-generation Nisei, remained loyal to Japan alone. In Maclean's Magazine, a professor at the University of British Columbia stated that the "Japanese in B.C. are as loyal to [Japan] as Japanese anywhere in the world." Other Canadians felt that tensions, in British Columbia specifically, originated from the fact that the Japanese were clustered together almost entirely in and around Vancouver. As a result, as early as 1938, there was talk of encouraging Japanese Canadians to begin moving east of the Rocky Mountains.

The actions of Japan leading up to World War II were also seen as cause for concern. Japan withdrew from the League of Nations in 1933, ignored the naval ratio set up by the Washington Naval Conference of 1922, refused to follow the Second London Naval Treaty in 1936, and allied with Germany with the Anti-Comintern Pact. Because many Canadians believed that resident Japanese immigrants would always remain loyal to their home country, the Japanese in British Columbia, even those born and raised in Canada, were often judged for these militant actions taken by their ancestral home.

== World War II ==
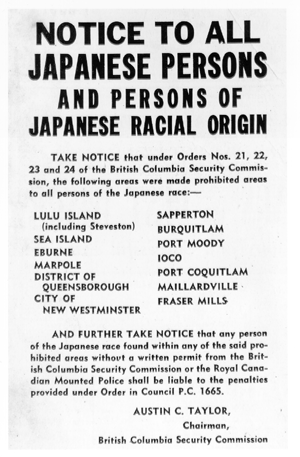
British Columbia Security Commission posting of evacuation of ethnic Japanese from designated areas on June 19, 1942.

When the Pacific War began, discrimination against Japanese Canadians increased. Following the attack on Pearl Harbor in December 1941, Japanese Canadians were all categorized, regardless of citizenship, as enemy aliens under the War Measures Act, yet the place of residency at the outbreak of the war significantly affected the removal of their personal rights.

Starting on December 8, 1941, 1,200 Japanese-Canadian-owned fishing vessels were impounded as a "defence measure". On January 14, 1942, the federal government issued an order calling for the removal of male Japanese nationals between 18 and 45 years of age from a designated protected area of 100 miles (160 km) inland from the British Columbia Coast. The federal government also enacted a ban against Japanese-Canadian fishing during the war, banned shortwave radios, and controlled the sale of gasoline and dynamite to Japanese Canadians. Japanese nationals removed from the coast after the January 14 order were sent to road camps around Jasper, Alberta. On February 19, 1942, U.S. President Franklin D. Roosevelt signed Executive Order 9066, which called for the removal of 110,000 people of Japanese ancestry from the American coastline. Anne Sunahara, a historian of internment, argues that "the American action sealed the fate of Japanese Canadians." On February 24, the Canadian government issued order in council PC 1486, which allowed for the removal of "all persons of Japanese origin". This order in council granted the minister of justice the broad powers of removing people from any protected area in Canada, but was meant for Japanese Canadians on the Pacific coast in particular. On February 25, the federal government announced that Japanese Canadians were being moved for reasons of national security. In all, 27,000 people were detained without charge or trial, and their property confiscated. Others were deported to Japan.

=== Advocacy for Japanese Canadians ===
However, not all Canadians believed that Japanese Canadians posed a threat to national security, including select senior officials of the Royal Canadian Mounted Police (RCMP), Royal Canadian Navy, and Department of Labour and Fisheries. Notable individuals on the side of the Japanese Canadians included Hugh Llewellyn Keenleyside, Assistant Under-Secretary at External Affairs during the internment of Japanese Canadians. Sunahara argues that Keenleyside was a sympathetic administrator who advocated strongly against the removal of Japanese Canadians from the BC coast. He unsuccessfully tried to remind other government officials of the distinction between Japanese foreign nationals and Canadian citizens in regards to personal and civil rights.

Frederick J. Mead, RCMP Assistant Commissioner, also used his position to advocate for Japanese Canadians and mitigate government actions. Mead was given the task of implementing several federal policies, including the removal of Japanese Canadians from the "protected zone" along the coast in 1942. Mead attempted to slow down the process, allowing individuals and families more time to prepare by following the exact letter of the law, which required a complicated set of permissions from busy government ministers, rather than the spirit of quick removal it intended.

However, it was not just government officials, but also private citizens, who were sympathetic to the Japanese-Canadian cause. Writing his first letter in January 1941, Captain V.C. Best, a resident of Salt Spring Island, advocated against mistreatment of Japanese Canadians for over two years. Best wrote to Keenleyside directly for much of that period, protesting anti-Japanese sentiment in the press, advocating for Japanese-Canadian enlistment in the armed forces, and, when the forced removal and internment of Japanese Canadians was underway, the conditions Japanese Canadians faced in internment camps.

=== Mackenzie King ===
William Lyon Mackenzie King served his final term as prime minister between 1935 and 1948, at which point he retired from Canadian politics. He had served two previous terms as prime minister, but this period was perhaps his most well-known. His policies during this period included unemployment insurance and tariff agreements with the UK and the United States.

Prime Minister King wrote in his diary daily for most of his life. These diary entries have provided historians with a sense of the thoughts and feelings King held during the war. Historian N.F. Dreisziger has written that, "though he undoubtedly considered himself a man of humanitarian outlook, he was a product of his times and shared the values of his fellow Canadians. He was—beyond doubt—an anti-Semite, and shouldered, more than any of his Cabinet colleagues, the responsibility of keeping Jewish refugees out of the country on the eve of and during the war."

Prior to the dropping of the atomic bombs on Japan, Prime Minister King seemed to oppose the creation and use of the atomic bomb. When King learned of the estimated date of the bomb dropping, he wrote in his diary: "It makes one very sad at heart to think of the loss of life that it [the bomb] will occasion among innocent people as well as those that are guilty." On August 6, 1945, the day of the atomic bombing of Hiroshima, King wrote in his diary: "It is fortunate that the use of the bomb should have been upon the Japanese rather than upon the white races of Europe.

=== Japanese Canadians serving in World Wars I and II ===
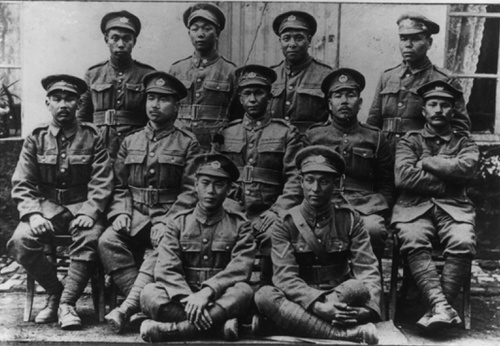
The Japanese-Canadian platoon of the 10th Battalion, CEF. during WWI.

For many Japanese Canadians, World War I provided an opportunity to prove their loyalty to Canada and their allies through military service in the hopes of gaining previously denied citizenship rights. In the early years of the war, however, the supply of enlisting men surpassed demand, so recruiting officers could be selective in who they accepted. Still, large numbers of Japanese Canadians volunteered, as did members of other visible minorities like Black Canadians and First Nations, so the Canadian government proposed a compromise that, if enlisted, minorities could fight separately. The Japanese Canadian community was very energetic on this front. The Canadian Japanese Association of Vancouver offered to raise a battalion in 1915 and, upon receiving a polite reply, proceeded to enlist and train 277 volunteers at the expense of the Japanese Canadian community. This offer, however, was rejected by Prime Minister Robert Borden and his federal cabinet. Yet, by the summer of 1916, the death toll in the trenches had risen, creating a new demand for soldiers and an increased need for domestic labour, which meant that the recruitment of minorities was reconsidered. Under this new policy, Japanese Canadians were able to enlist individually by travelling elsewhere in Canada where their presence was deemed less of a threat. By the end of World War I, 185 Japanese Canadians served overseas in 11 different battalions.

During World War II, some of the interned Japanese Canadians were combat veterans of the Canadian Expeditionary Force, including several men who had been decorated for bravery on the Western Front. Despite the first iterations of veterans affairs associations established during World War II, fear and racism drove policy and trumped veterans' rights, meaning that virtually no Japanese-Canadian veterans were exempt from being removed from the BC coast.

Small numbers of military-age Japanese-Canadian men were permitted to serve in the Canadian Army in the Second World War as interpreters and in signal/intelligence units. By January 1945, several Japanese Canadian men were attached to British units in the Far East as interpreters and translators. In total, about 200 Canadian Nisei joined Canadian forces during World War II.

Throughout the war, Canadians of "Oriental racial origin" were not called upon to perform compulsory military service. Japanese Canadian men who had chosen to serve in the Canadian army during the war to prove their allegiance to Canada were discharged only to discover they were unable to return to the BC coast, or unable to have their rights reinstated.

== Forced removal, dispersal, and internment of Japanese Canadians ==
A Japanese Canadian man holds a small parcel up to a train window during the evacuation to interior British Columbia internment camps, 1942.

Forcibly dispersed Japanese Canadians arriving in Slocan City.

After Canada's declaration of war on Japan on December 8, 1941, many called for the uprooting and internment of Japanese Canadians under the Defence of Canada Regulations. Since the arrival of Japanese, Chinese, and South Asian immigrants to British Columbia in the late 1800s, there had been calls for their exclusion. Vancouver Member of Parliament Ian Mackenzie saw the war as an opportunity to expel Japanese Canadians from British Columbia. He wrote to a constituent that "their country should never have been Canada ... I do not believe the Japanese are an assimilable race."

Bordering the Pacific Ocean, British Columbia was believed to be easily susceptible to enemy attacks from Japan. Even though both the RCMP and the Department of National Defence lacked proof of any sabotage or espionage, there were fears that Japanese Canadians supported Japan in the war. Prime Minister William Lyon Mackenzie King, for example, agreed with the view that all Japanese Canadians "would be saboteurs and would help Japan when the moment came." In total, 22,000 Japanese Canadians (14,000 of whom were born in Canada) were interned starting in 1942.

Widespread internment was authorized on March 4, 1942, with order-in-council 1665 passed under the Defence of Canada Regulations of the War Measures Act, which gave the federal government the power to intern all "persons of Japanese racial origin". A 100-mile (160 km) wide strip along the Pacific coast was deemed "protected", and men of Japanese origin between the ages of 18 and 45 were removed. Thereafter, the entire Japanese Canadian population was uprooted from this designated zone. By November 1942, 22,000 people were displaced.

=== Sites of forced relocation ===
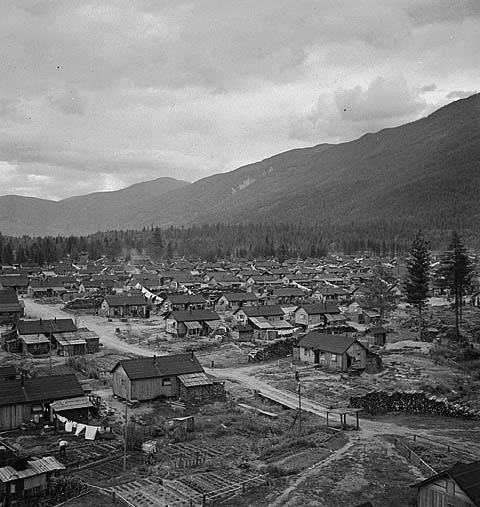
Lemon Creek Internment camp, June 1944, Slocan Valley, British Columbia (Canada)

Japanese Canadians on the west coast were forcibly moved to road camps, sugar beet farms, or prisoner-of-war camps. Before being sent off, many of the men and their families were processed through Hastings Park in Vancouver; others were sent immediately for various destinations eastward. Many of the men at the park were separated from their families and sent into the British Columbia Interior or elsewhere in Canada, but most women and children stayed in the park until they were sent to Internment Camps in the interior or decided as a family to join the sugar beet farms in the Prairies.

Many of the Japanese nationals removed from the coast after January 14, 1942, were sent to road camps in the BC interior or sugar beet projects on the Prairies, such as in Taber, Alberta. Despite the 100-mile quarantine, a few Japanese-Canadian men remained in McGillivray Falls, which was just outside the protected zone. However, they were employed at a logging operation at Devine (near D'Arcy in the Gates Valley), which was in the protected zone but without road access to the coast. Japanese-Canadians interned in Lillooet Country found employment within farms, stores, and the railway.

The Liberal government also deported able-bodied Japanese-Canadian labourers to camps near fields and orchards, such as BC's Okanagan Valley. The Japanese-Canadian labourers were used as a solution to a shortage of farm workers. This obliterated any Japanese competition in the fishing sector. During the 1940s, the Canadian government created policies to direct Chinese, Japanese, and First Nations into farming, and other sectors of the economy that "other groups were abandoning for more lucrative employment elsewhere."

In early March 1942, all ethnic Japanese people were ordered out of the protected area, and a daytime-only curfew was imposed on them. Various camps in the Lillooet area and in Christina Lake were formally "self-supporting projects" (also called "relocation centres") which housed selected middle- and upper-class families and others not deemed as much of a threat to public safety.

The forced removal of many Japanese-Canadian men to become labourers elsewhere in Canada created confusion and panic among families, causing some men to refuse orders to ship out to labour camps. On March 23, 1942, a group of Nisei refused to be shipped out and so were sent to prisoner-of-war camps in Ontario to be detained. The Nisei Mass Evacuation Group was formed to protest family break-ups and lobbied government organizations on the topic. However, their attempts were ignored and members of the group began going underground, preferring to be interned or sent to Ontario rather than join labour groups.

By July 1942, after strikes occurred within the labour camps themselves, the federal government made a policy to keep families together in their removal to internment camps in the BC interior or sugar beet farms across the prairies.

Different relocation sites also produced differing forms of confinement. Shelly Ikebuchi Ketchell argued that the Sugar Beet program in Alberta and Manitoba, sponsored by the government remained carceral despite being presented as a form of self-supporting relocation. Japanese Canadians on these placements remained subject to state and community monitoring which included surveillance, restrictions, and coercion. This demonstrated that the supposed freedom from an internment camp did not mean freedom from state control.

=== Camp conditions ===
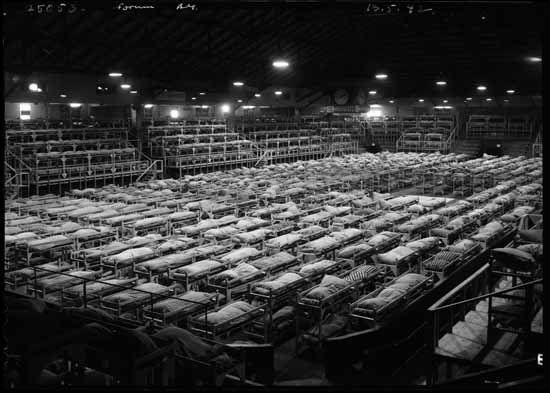
Men's dormitory in Forum building on 13 May 1942.

Many Canadians were unaware of the living conditions in the internment camps. The Japanese Canadians who resided within the camp at Hastings Park were placed in stables and barnyards, where they lived without privacy in an unsanitary environment. Kimiko, a former internee, attested to the "intense cold during the winter" and her only source of heat was from a "pot-bellied stove" within the stable. General conditions were poor enough that the Red Cross transferred fundamental food shipments from civilians affected by the war to the internees.

Some internees spoke out against their conditions, often complaining to the British Columbia Security Commission directly whenever possible. In one incident, 15 men who had been separated from their families and put to work in the Slocan Valley protested by refusing to work for four days straight. Despite attempts at negotiation, the men were eventually informed that they would be sent to the Immigration Building jail in Vancouver for their refusal to work. Their mistreatment caused several of the men to begin hoping that Japan would win the war and force Canada to compensate them.

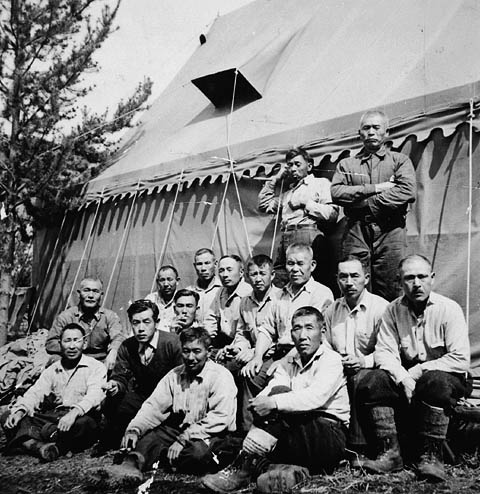
A road crew of interned men building the Yellowhead Highway.

Interned workers at Taft Road Camp

Internees living in tent shelters at Slocan City Internment Camp.

Japanese-Canadian family at Kaslo Internment Camp.

Internment camp

Tashme, a camp on Highway 3 just east of Hope, was notorious for the camp's harsh conditions and was just outside the protected area. Other internment camps, including Slocan, were in the Kootenay Country in southeastern British Columbia. Leadership positions within the camps were offered only to Nisei, or Canadian-born citizens of Japanese origin, thereby excluding Issei, the original immigrants from Japan.

The internment camps in the B.C. interior were often ghost towns with little infrastructure to support the influx of people. When Japanese Canadians began arriving in the summer and fall of 1942, any accommodations given were shared between multiple families and many had to live in tents while shacks were constructed in the summer of 1942. The shacks were small and built with damp, green wood. When winter came, the wood made everything damp and the lack of insulation meant that the inside of the shacks often froze during the night.

Very little was provided for the internees – green wood to build accommodation and a stove was all that most received. Men could make some money in construction work to support their families, but women had very few opportunities. Yet, finding work was almost essential since interned Japanese Canadians had to support themselves and buy food using the small salaries they had collected or through allowances from the government for the unemployed. The relief rates were so low that many families had to use their personal savings to live in the camps.

By the spring of 1943, however, some conditions began to change as Japanese Canadians in the camp organized themselves. Removal from the coast to ghost towns had been done based on location, so many communities moved together and were placed in same camp together. This preserved local communal ties and facilitated organizing and negotiating for better conditions in the camp.

=== Effects of camps on Gender, family and labor ===
Japanese-Canadian women and children faced a specific set of challenges that greatly affected their way of life and broke down the social and cultural norms that had developed. Whole families were taken from their homes and separated from each other. Husbands and wives were almost always separated when sent to camps and, less commonly, some mothers were separated from their children as well. Japanese-Canadian families typically had a patriarchal structure, meaning the husband was the centre of the family. Since husbands were often separated from their families, wives were left to reconfigure the structure of the family and the long-established divisions of labour that were so common in the Japanese-Canadian household.

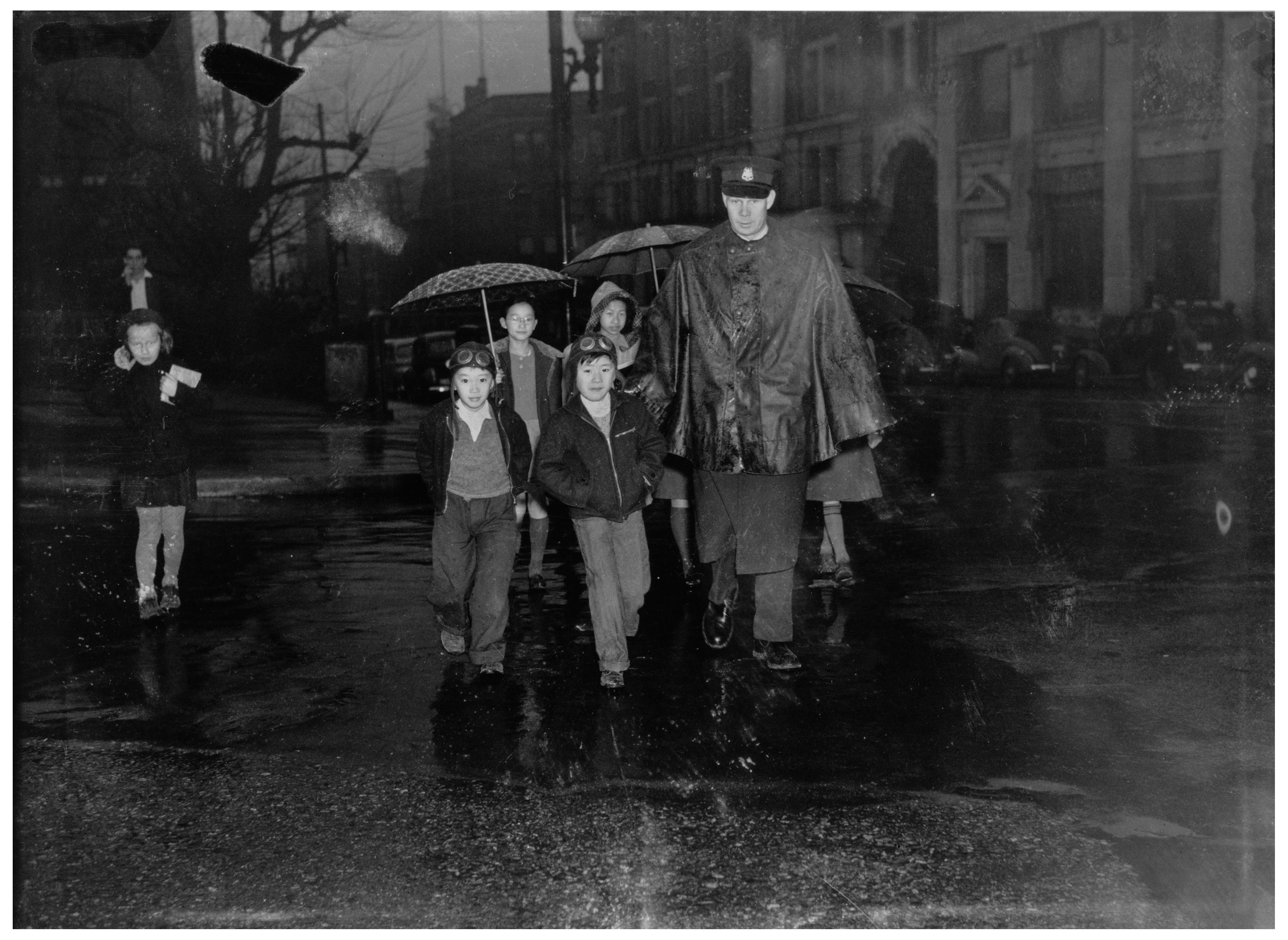
Japanese Canadian children being escorted across Pender Street by Vancouver policeman in 1942.

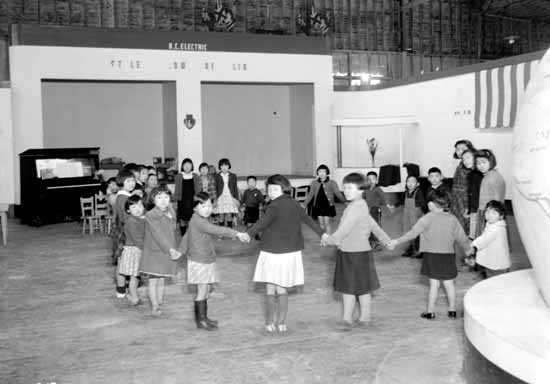
Japanese Canadian evacuation Hastings Park – kindergarten.

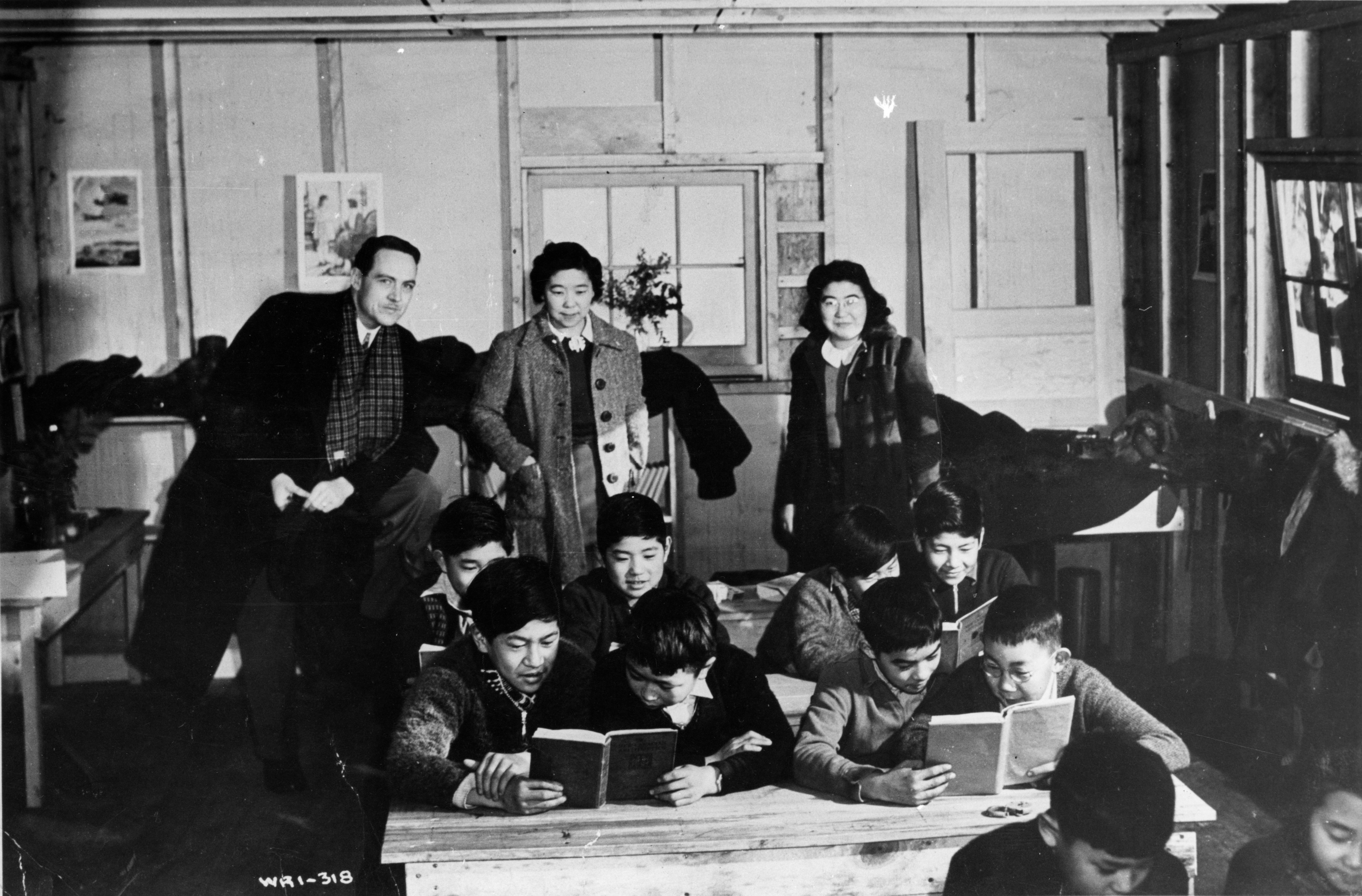
Government official meeting Hide Hyodo Shimizu's class at New Denver Internment Camp school in 1943.

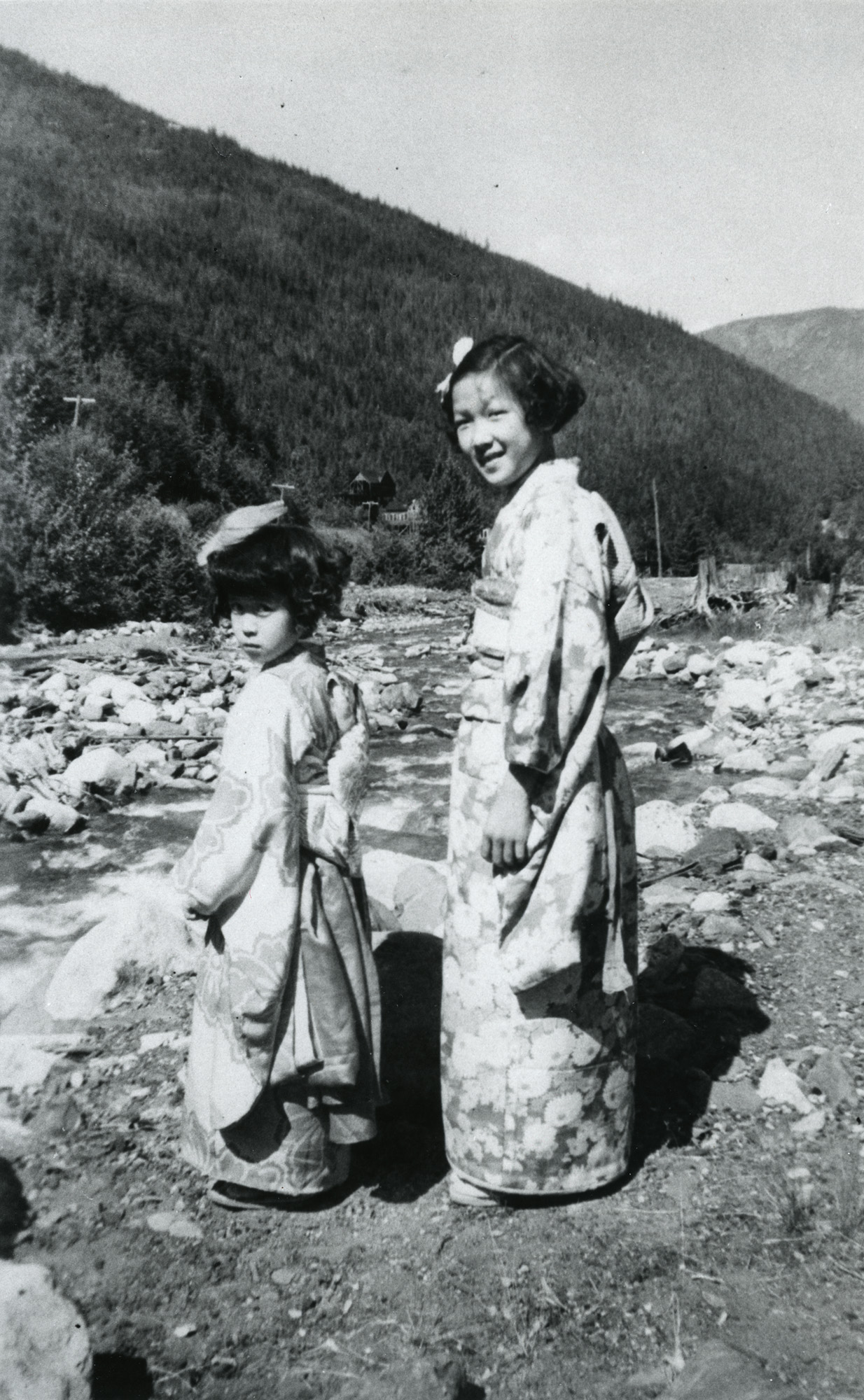
Two Japanese Canadian girls in kimono participating in 1943 Bon Festival at Sandon Camp.

Group of Japanese children at Lemon Creek camp

Group of Japanese Canadian girls participating in Bon Festival at Greenwood Internment Camp in summer 1942.

==== Post-war ====
Oftentimes after internment, families could not be reunited. Many mothers were left with children, but no husband. Furthermore, communities were impossible to rebuild. The lack of community led to an even more intensified gap between the generations. Children had no one with whom to speak Japanese outside the home and as a result they rarely learned the language fluently. This fracturing of community also led to a lack of Japanese cultural foundation and many children lost a strong connection with their culture. Mothers had also learned to be bolder in their own way and were now taking on wage-earning jobs, which meant that they had less time to teach their children about Japanese culture and traditions. The internment camps forever changed the way of Japanese-Canadian life.

=== Camp locations and relocation sites ===
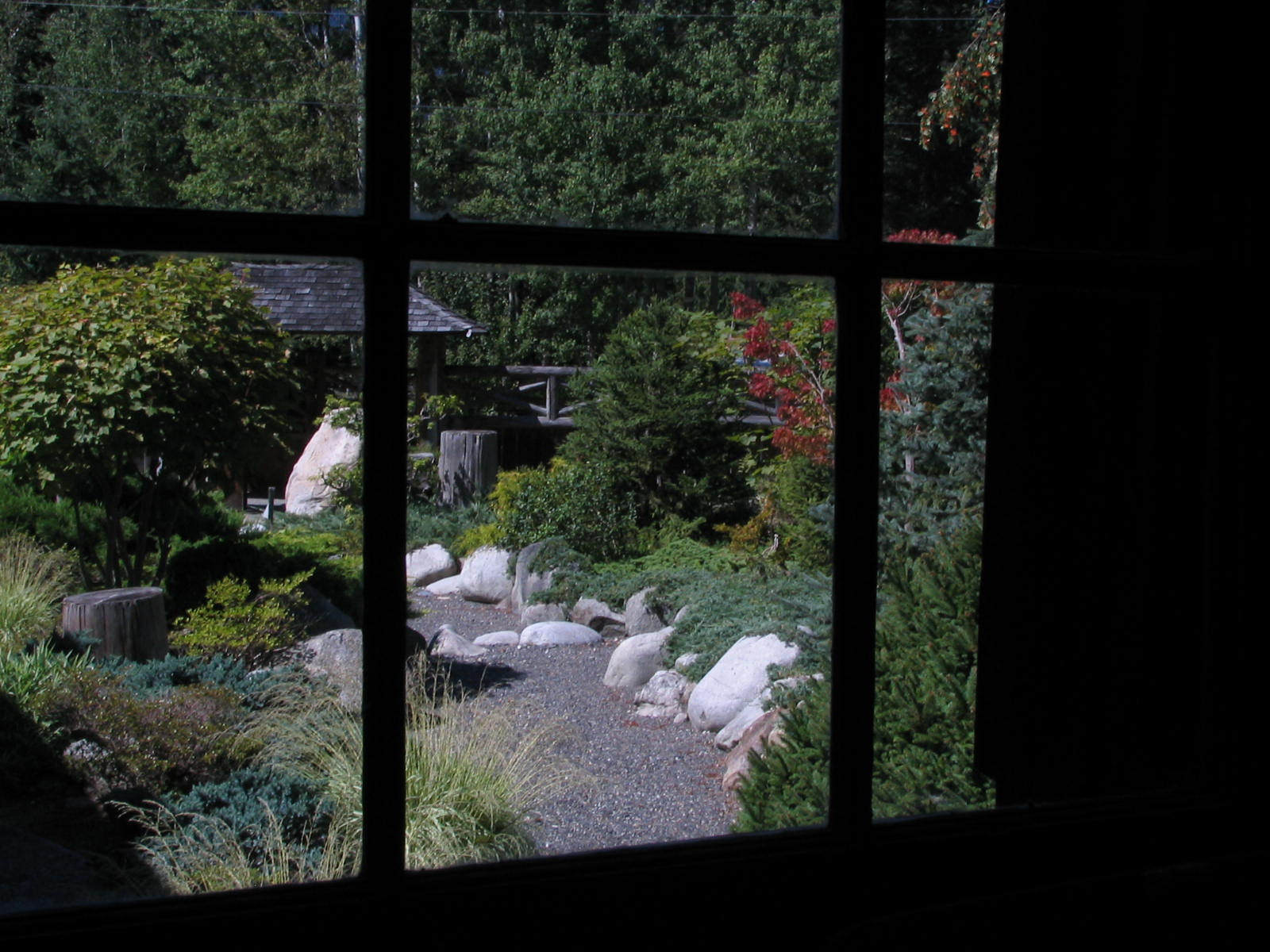
The Nikkei Internment Memorial Centre, a National Historic Site of Canada

- Kootenays region of British Columbia:
  - Bay Farm
  - Greenwood
  - Kaslo
  - Lemon Creek
  - New Denver
  - Popoff
  - Rosebery
  - Sandon
  - Slocan City
- Elsewhere in British Columbia:
  - Bridge River (South Shalalth)
  - McGillivray Falls
  - Minto City
  - East Lillooet
  - Tashme (now Sunshine Valley)
- Ontario:
  - Chatham
  - Petawawa
  - Schreiber
  - St. Thomas
  - Toronto
- Elsewhere in Canada:
  - Alberta and Manitoba — sugar beet farms
  - Kananaskis Country, Alberta

== Dispossession of Japanese Canadians ==
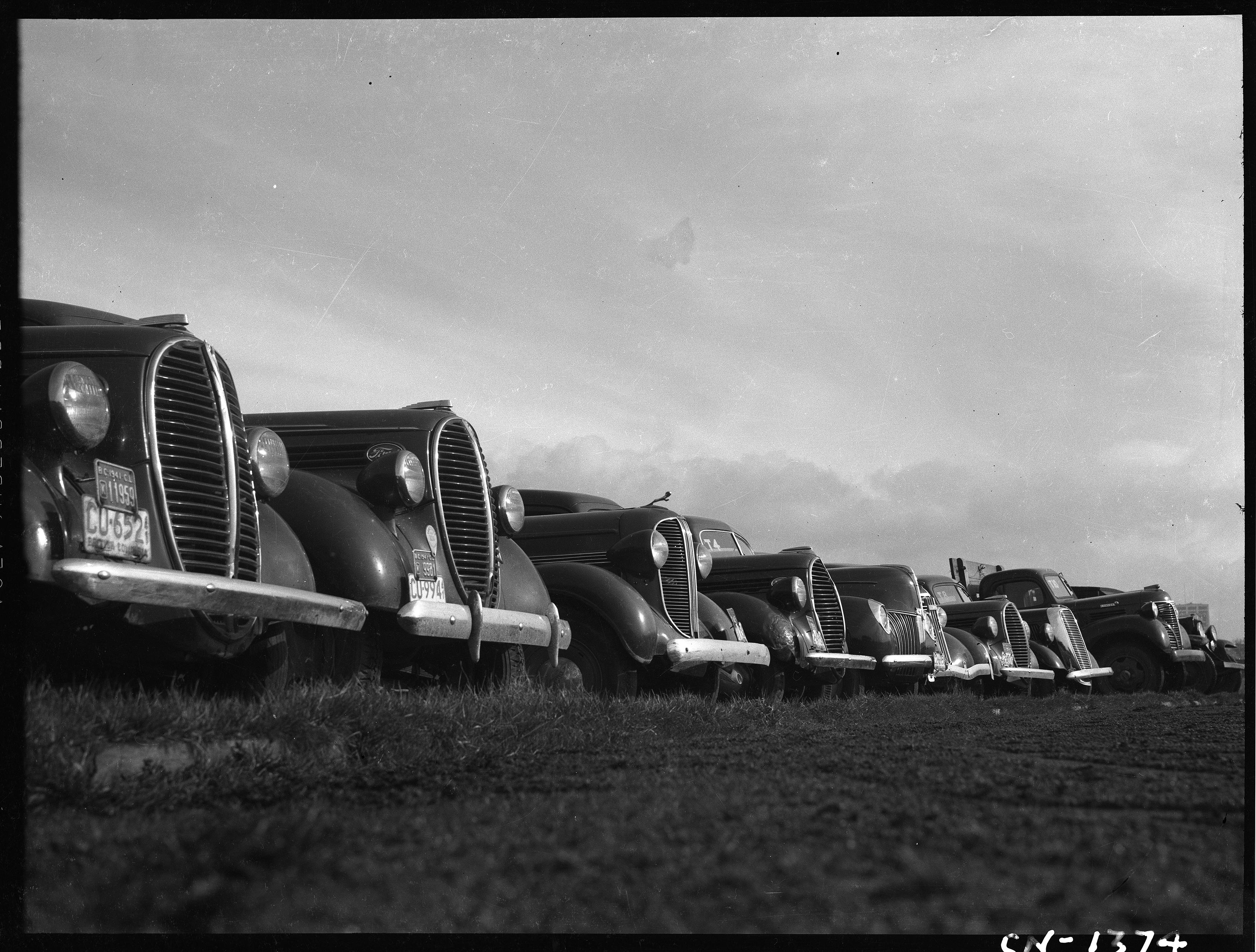
Seized vehicles of Japanese Canadians at Hastings Park.

The dispossession began in December 1941 with the seizure of fishing vessels owned by Japanese Canadians, and eventually led to the loss of homes, farms, businesses, and personal belongings.

Ian MacKenzie, the federal Minister of Pensions and National Health and British Columbia representative in Cabinet, was a political advocate for the dispossession of the property of Japanese Canadians. He campaigned to exclude Asians from the province of British Columbia, saying to a local newspaper in 1922, "Economically we cannot combat with them; racially we cannot assimilate them...we must exclude them from our midst and prohibit them from owning land."

The "Custodian of Enemy Property", an office of the federal government, was given administrative control of the property of Japanese Canadians, beginning in 1941 and continuing until 1952. As a bureaucracy under the authority of the Cabinet, the office of the Custodian took its directions from Order in Council 1665, as later amended by Order 2483, which allowed them to seize the property of Japanese Canadians. "This is not a confiscation" the government said, "the Custodian will administer property in the interests of the [owners]." The January 19, 1943, Order in Council 469 expanded the Custodian's power to sell the property of Japanese Canadians. "The Custodian has been vested with the power and responsibility of controlling and managing any property of the persons of Japanese race...the power to liquidate, sell, or otherwise dispose of such property" without their consent.

These actions were carried out with significant public support. Citizens wrote to their representatives urging the removal of the Japanese Canadian community from British Columbia. Government officials reported property damage done to the homes of uprooted Japanese Canadians as members of the public engaged in "ransacking", "looting" and "wanton destruction". One official reported "[a]lmost every building formerly owned by Japanese...has been entered at one time or another.

The dispossession and sale of property of Japanese Canadians was recognized as having long term implications for Japanese Canadians. Secretary of State Norman McClarty stated that the forced sales would be "tantamount to saying that [Japanese Canadians] will never be returned to Vancouver...This may of course be desirable". Scholars note that Ian Mackenzie, the British Columbia representative in Cabinet, supported this "permanent exclusion of Japanese Canadians from the entire 'coast of British Columbia'". Further, the Veteran's Land Act distributed the dispossessed land of Japanese Canadians to returning WWII veterans, resulting in Japanese Canadians having nothing to return to when internment ended in 1949.

=== Fishing boats ===
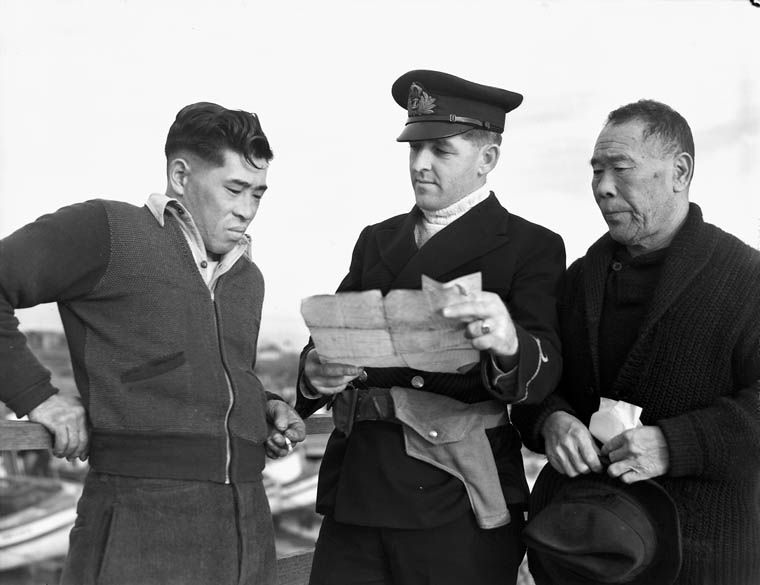
A Royal Canadian Navy officer questions Japanese-Canadian fishermen while confiscating their boat.

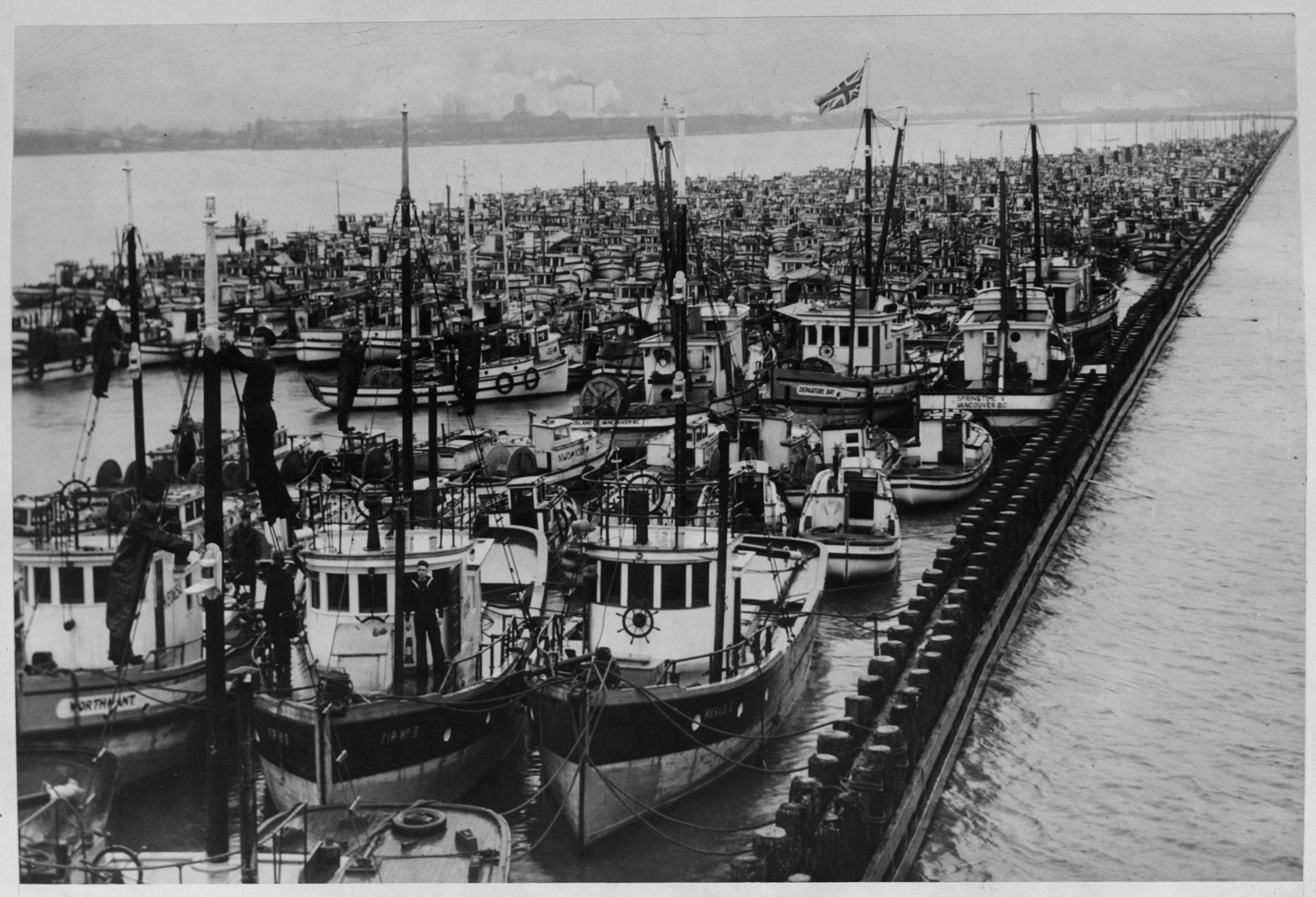
Royal Canadian Navy sailors aboard the confiscated fishing vessels of Japanese Canadians on the Fraser River.

Fishing vessels were among the first forms of property taken from Japanese Canadians. On December 8, 1941, Japanese Canadian fishers were required to surrender over 1,300 vessels to authorities. On January 13, 1942, order in council PC 288 created the Fishing Vessel Disposal Committee. Chaired by Judge Sidney Smith, it was instructed to enable Japanese Canadian boat owners to "freely negotiate for charters, leases, or sales" of their vessels. Instead, the committee forced the sale of the fishing vessels, a decision that government lawyers later admitted exceeded the committee's terms of reference and therefore was illegal.

Although officials claimed these measures were required due to war, fishing for salmon was a hotly contested issue between the white Canadians and Japanese Canadians. In 1919, Japanese Canadians received four thousand and six hundred of the salmon-gill net licences, representing roughly half of all of the licences the government had to distribute. In a very public move on behalf of the Department of Fisheries in British Columbia, it was recommended that in the future Japanese Canadians should never again receive more fishing licences than they had in 1919 and also that every year thereafter that number be reduced. These were measures taken on behalf of the provincial government to oust the Japanese from salmon fishing. The federal government also got involved in 1926, when the House of Commons' Standing Committee on Fisheries put forward suggestions that the number of fishing licences issued to Japanese Canadians be reduced by ten percent a year, until they were entirely removed from the industry by 1937. Yet, the reason the government gave for impounding the few remaining and operating Japanese-Canadian fishing boats was that the government feared these boats would be used by Japan to mount a coastal attack on British Columbia.

Many boats belonging to Japanese Canadians were damaged, and over one hundred sank.

=== State management of Japanese-Canadian property ===
During the process of internment, federal officials told Japanese Canadians that their property would be held as a "protective measure" only and then returned to its owners. However, as early as April 1942, as Japanese Canadians were being actively interned, Ian Alistair Mackenzie began planning with Thomas Crerar and Gordan Murchison for the use of Japanese Canadian land for veteran settlement under the upcoming Veteran's Land Act program. Property appraisal was undertaken by the Soldier Settlement Board which valued the farms at less than half their actual market values. Order 5523 passed in June 1942 threatened jail time and $1000 fine for individuals attempting to make private arrangements for their farms.

==== Storage, looting, and vandalism ====
In April 1942, the Office of the Custodian allowed Japanese Canadians to document the value of their property and possessions using registration forms prior to their displacement. However, insufficient warnings of displacement (sometimes as little 24 hours in advance) gave Japanese Canadians little chance to safely store their personal items. Some buried or hid belongings to protect them. Vacated Japanese Canadian communities were commonly vandalized and looted. An official from the town of Steveston reported that "[a]lmost every building formerly owned by Japanese…has been entered at one time or another." In Maple Ridge and Pitt Meadows, officials described that "it appears to be just the love of destruction which has made the thieves go through the buildings…" The Marpole-Richmond Review reported that, despite attempts to remove valuable items from the Steveston Buddhist Temple, looting had resulted in "numbers of cans in which have been deposited the white ashes of cremated former citizens of Steveston, have had their seals broken and their contents scattered over the floor…"

As a result, officials sought to warehouse many of the belongings of Japanese Canadians. However, poor conditions in these facilities and ongoing looting led to the eventual loss of untold amounts of movable property. The Office of the Custodian also struggled with a significant administrative task: multiple people were appointed to oversee and pinpoint how much property each Japanese Canadian had, the condition it was in, the value it held, as well as to establish title, maintain insurance claims, pay miscellaneous expenses and translate and type all communication with Japanese Canadian property owners. Before the Office of the Custodian could come up with a system for organizing and maintaining the property, creditors, Japanese Canadians, other state officials, and members of the general public were all inquiring about property and pressuring the Custodian for answers.

==== Role of Glenn Willoughby McPherson ====
Glenn Willoughby McPherson was a young bureaucrat who established and directed the Vancouver Office of the Custodian during the time of the forced property sales. He held racial bias and believed skin colour determined loyalty, once saying that "the only way the Yellow Race can obtain their place in the Sun is by winning the war." In addition to acting as director of the Office of Custodian in Vancouver, McPherson acted as an intelligence agent for the British government. McPherson's role as a British agent was to send letters to update them on what was occurring in British Columbia. In these letters, he expressed prejudice against Japanese Canadians and his view that the RCMP was not doing enough to control them: "police intelligence is greatly understaffed and...the Japanese have developed a high inferiority complex." Historians have speculated that he was the author of a 161-page document that was sent anonymously to the RCMP in June 1942. It identified suspects of Japanese heritage who were alleged to be a threat to the community. The document specified three different levels of danger:

- CLASS A: identified 5 suspects who were to be immediately arrested and questioned
- CLASS B: identified 173 suspects as dangerous
- CLASS C: identified 74 suspects who were deemed as safety issues for the community

The document also claimed that Japanese sex workers were spies for the Japanese government. This role and McPherson's personal views were concealed from Japanese Canadians, while he orchestrated the sale of their property. Starting in September 1942, after most Japanese Canadians had been uprooted from coastal British Columbia, McPherson turned his attention to the forced sale of remaining Japanese Canadian-owned property.

==== Decision to sell ====
On January 11, 1943, a meeting of cabinet ministers (attended by Ian Alistair Mackenzie, Norman McLarty, Thomas Crerar, and Humphrey Mitchell) made the decision to permit the sale of Japanese Canadian owned property, which had been previously seized. It was argued that it would be in the Japanese Canadian owners' best interest to sell because the value of their properties would go down over time.

Glenn McPherson was asked to write the resulting order in council (469), which was passed into law on January 19, 1943. The order gave McPherson the right to begin organizing the sale of all Japanese Canadian owned property. This signified a shift away from prior efforts to preserve Japanese Canadians' belongings. July 1943 brought mass forced sale of real estate while well-attended weekly auctions in Vancouver were used from September 1943 to 1947 to sell chattels.

McPherson and the team working with the Custodian of Enemy Property started selling belongings deemed as "perishable". Examples of these items would be grocery stock or other things that would deteriorate quickly. All of these items were sold without consent. Soon, the Custodian began claiming that items like fishing boats and automobiles were to be classified as perishable as well. Glenn McPherson rationalized this by saying that they were losing value over time and that the government could not afford to maintain them. Shortly thereafter, in the later months of 1942, McPherson began to argue that all Japanese Canadian owned property was perishable. Only property loosely defined by the Custodian of Enemy Property as having "sentimental value and religious nature" would be preserved throughout the auctions until 1949.

Unaware Japanese Canadians received receipts for a small fraction of the value that they saw in their property. The final auctions in 1947 left fragments of Japanese Canadian's materials including only photograph albums, kotos, family shrines, and any items that would not sell in auction. These belongings could rarely be reunited with their owners.

=== Protest ===
Japanese Canadians lobbied the government to reconsider the forced sale of their property. They wrote letters to government officials or the Custodian of Enemy Property to protest. In British Columbia, officials identified 292 letters that they felt "gave a fair representation" of Japanese Canadians' concerns. A majority of the letters protested on the grounds of their property being sold for unreasonably low prices, without consideration of deeper property value or consent. In addition, the forced sale of property was seen as a violation of their rights as Canadian citizens.

Several risks were involved in writing to the Custodian. In a time when they were viewed as 'enemy aliens', many Japanese Canadians wrote to threaten legal action, or attempted to invoke their rights as citizens. Others, such as Tomio and Akira Yokoyama, immediately returned their cheques to the Custodian, and risked the loss of all sale revenue to convey their message.

A majority of the letters written by Japanese Canadians to the Custodian protesting or refusing the sale of their property did so on the grounds of the value of their lands. While Japanese Canadians' property and personal items were sold for less than their worth in market value, most owners contested that the Custodian had not taken into account the time, labour, and work owners invested in their land. Nor did the sales account for the memories, experiences and emotional value that many owners associated with their homes. In 1944, Toyo Takahashi wrote to the Custodian, explaining that when she and her husband moved into 42 Gorge Road, Victoria they spent over ten years of labour and hard work cultivating a garden of rare and exotic plants that won a horticultural award and was visited by the Queen in 1937. Many Japanese Canadians, including Takahashi, also emphasized the future value of their land, the labour put into building farms or businesses was an investment for many Japanese Canadians into not only their futures, but also for their children, and future generations. Japanese Canadians protested the sales forced upon them by the Custodian on the grounds that the sales failed to truly compensate owners for the holistic value of their land.

An undeserved liquidation of my property...will not only jeopardize our present status but far worse our future welfare as well. This property is our home, the reward for long years of toil and anticipation, a source of recreation, a stake in the future of Victoria, and an insurance for our later welfare. — Toyo Takahashi

Alongside the underestimation of property value, many letters stressed a violation of democratic rights. Tatsuo Onotera wrote in his letter, "I have been brought up as any one of your other citizens believing this is a fair and Democratic country, but the way we are being treated I have my doubts." Some writers compared the injustice they experienced to Nazis mistreatment of Jews in Europe. Tsurukichi Takemoto wrote, "Isn't the method you're using like the Nazis? Do you think it is democratic?" These and many other letters questioned the morality of the Canadian government. Half of the letters written spoke about consent or lack thereof, asserting they should have the right to refuse the sale of their property. Several writers sought to prove their citizenship as Canadians by explaining military service or stating that they were born on Canadian soil.

Many letters sent by Japanese Canadians to Government officials and the Vancouver Office of the Custodian protesting or rejecting the sale of their property were filed away by Frank Shears, who oversaw day-to-day operations at the Custodian's Office. Letter writers received form letters informing them that the sale of their property was made based on the appraised and market value in accordance with federal law. In 1947, due to an upcoming royal commission, Frank Shears reviewed the letters for the legal representatives of the Crown and relayed that the basis of protest fell with two distinct spheres, tangible, or monetary and intangible, beyond money. Shears recommended that the Crown's response "should lie strictly with tangible and specific", ensuring that the deeper concerns expressed by the Japanese Canadians would not be addressed or considered.

=== Nakashima v. Canada ===
When the Canadian government issued order 1665 on March 4, 1942, Japanese Canadians were forced out of their homes and into internment camps. A few weeks after order 1665 was put into legal effect, the Canadian government released order 2483, which stated that the properties and belongings of interned Japanese Canadians were to be protected and held in their best interest by the Custodian. Japanese Canadians realized that the Canadian government was not acting in their best interest when their property began being sold without their consent.

Eikichi Nakashima, Tadao Wakabayashi, and Jitaro Tanaka were three Japanese Canadians who were facing the loss of their properties to the Canadian government after spending time in internment camps. They were selected by their community to represent the fight against the sales by suing the Canadian government and the Crown. Their case was slow-moving, but with the assistance of their lawyer, J. Arthur MacLennan, they were able after some delay to secure a court date on May 29, 1944. The opposing lawyer, Fredrick Percy Varcoe, Deputy Minister of Justice, argued in front of Judge Joseph Thorarinn Thorson that the sales followed from the "emergency of war". Also he argued that "the Custodian was not the Crown", so Japanese Canadians, on this logic, had named the wrong defendant. Further, Varcoe argued that "the relevant orders created no trust", emphasizing that it was well within the rights of the Custodian to sell the property of Japanese Canadians without defying order 2483. Finally, Varcoe argued that the animosity of white British Columbians toward Japanese Canadians made the sale of only some properties unfeasible because he claimed that white buyers would refuse to purchase if Japanese Canadians were expected to return to live alongside them.

After three days of court, Thorson stated "I do not think anyone expects me to give judgment now". Three years later, after the war had ended and the Canadian government had begun to exile nearly 4,000 Japanese Canadians, Thorson released his judgment. On August 29, 1947, it was announced that Nakashima, Wakabayashi, and Tanaka had lost. In his judgment, Thorson did not acknowledge any of MacLennan's arguments and mentioned very little about the lives of the litigants. Without addressing the larger harms of the dispossession of Japanese Canadians, stated that "the custodian could neither be characterized as the Crown nor its servant"; therefore, the case ended before it began since the litigants had sued the wrong entity. In addition to losing their homes, Thorson also charged Nakashima, Wakabayashi, and Tanaka for the legal costs of the government.

=== Bird Commission ===
In 1946 and 1947, pressure began to build for the federal government to address the forced sale of Japanese-Canadian property. In 1947, representatives from the Co-operative Committee on Japanese Canadians and the Japanese Canadian Citizens for Democracy (JCCD) which had formed in 1943 asked the federal government's Public Accounts Committee to launch a Royal Commission to look into the losses associated with the forced sales. In June 1947, the Public Accounts Committee recommended that a commission be struck to examine the claims of Japanese Canadians living in Canada for losses resulting from receiving less than the fair market value of their property.

A Royal Commission was set up later that year, headed by Justice Henry Bird, with terms of reference that placed the onus on the Japanese-Canadian claimant to prove that the Custodian of Enemy Property was negligent in the handling of their property. The terms of reference soon expanded to also include the sale of the property below market value, but no cases were accepted that dealt with issues outside the control of the Custodian of Enemy Property.

In late 1947, Bird began to hear individual claims, but by 1948 it became clear to the commission that the magnitude of claims and amount of property in dispute could take years to settle and become very expensive for claimants because of legal fees. Thus, in the spring of 1949, the Bird Commission adopted a category formula that set out certain reimbursement percentages for each category of claim, except for unusual circumstances.

The commission concluded in 1950; the report stated:

- The commission found that claims relating to fishing boats should receive 12.5% of the sale price as compensation and receive the Custodian of Enemy Property's 13.5% commission. Out of the 950 fishing boats seized in 1941, only 75 claims were processed by the Bird Commission.
- Claims relating to fishing nets and gear should receive 25% of the sale price.
- Claims relating to cars and trucks should receive 25% of the sale price.
- Claims relating to the sale of personal belongings were deemed mostly worthless and claimants received the Custodian of Enemy Property's commission plus 6.8% of the sale price.
- Very few claims relating to personal real estate received any form of compensation because the Commission concluded that most were sold for fair market value.
- Farmers whose property had been seized by the Soldier Settlement Board received $632,226.61 combined, despite that being only half of their total claim.

The top monetary award was $69,950 against a $268,675 claim by the Royston Lumber Company, and the smallest claim was $2.50 awarded to Ishina Makino for a claim against a car. After the report was released, the CCJC and National Japanese Canadian Citizens' Association wanted to push for further compensation, however, when claimants accepted their Bird Commission reimbursements, they had to sign a form agreeing that they would not press any further claims.

By 1950, the Bird Commission awarded $1.3 million in claims to 1,434 Japanese Canadians. However, it only accepted claims based on loss of property, refusing to compensate for wrongdoing in terms of civil rights, damages due to loss of earnings, disruption of education, or other factors. The issue of Japanese Canadian losses was not revisited in-depth until the Price Waterhouse study in 1986.

== Postwar deportation ==
=== Resettlement and repatriation to Japan ===
It is the government's plan to get these people out of B.C. as fast as possible. It is my personal intention, as long as I remain in public life, to see they never come back here. Let our slogan be for British Columbia: 'No Japs from the Rockies to the seas.'

— Ian Mackenzie, Minister of Pensions

British Columbian politicians began pushing for the permanent removal of Japanese Canadians in 1944. By December, U.S. President Franklin Roosevelt had announced that Japanese Americans would soon be allowed to return to the West Coast, and pressure to publicize Canada's plans for their interned Japanese Canadians was high.

Officials created a questionnaire to distinguish "loyal" from "disloyal" Japanese Canadians and gave internees the choice to move east of the Rockies immediately or be "repatriated" to Japan at the end of the war. Some 10,000 Japanese Canadians, unable to move on short notice or simply hesitant to remain in Canada after their wartime experiences, chose deportation. The rest opted to move east, many to the city of Toronto, where they could take part in agricultural work.

When news of Japan's surrender in August 1945 reached the internment camps, thousands balked at the idea of resettling in the war-torn country and attempted to revoke their applications for repatriation. All such requests were denied, and deportation to Japan began in May 1946. While the government offered free passage to those who were willing to be deported to Japan, thousands of Nisei born in Canada were being sent to a country they had never known. Families were divided, and being deported to a country that had been destroyed by bombs and was now hunger-stricken due to the war.

By 1947, most Japanese Canadians not slated for deportation had moved from British Columbia to the Toronto area, where they often become farmhands or took on similar labour jobs as they had done before. Several Japanese Canadians who resettled in the east wrote letters back to those still in British Columbia about the harsh labour conditions in the fields of Ontario and the prejudiced attitudes they would encounter. White-collar jobs were not open to them, and most Japanese Canadians were reduced to "wage-earners".

Public attitudes towards the internees had softened somewhat since the start of the war, and citizens formed the Cooperative Committee on Japanese Canadians to protest the forced deportation. The government relented in 1947 and allowed those still in the country to remain; however, by this time 3,964 Japanese Canadians had already been deported to Japan.

=== Reforms ===
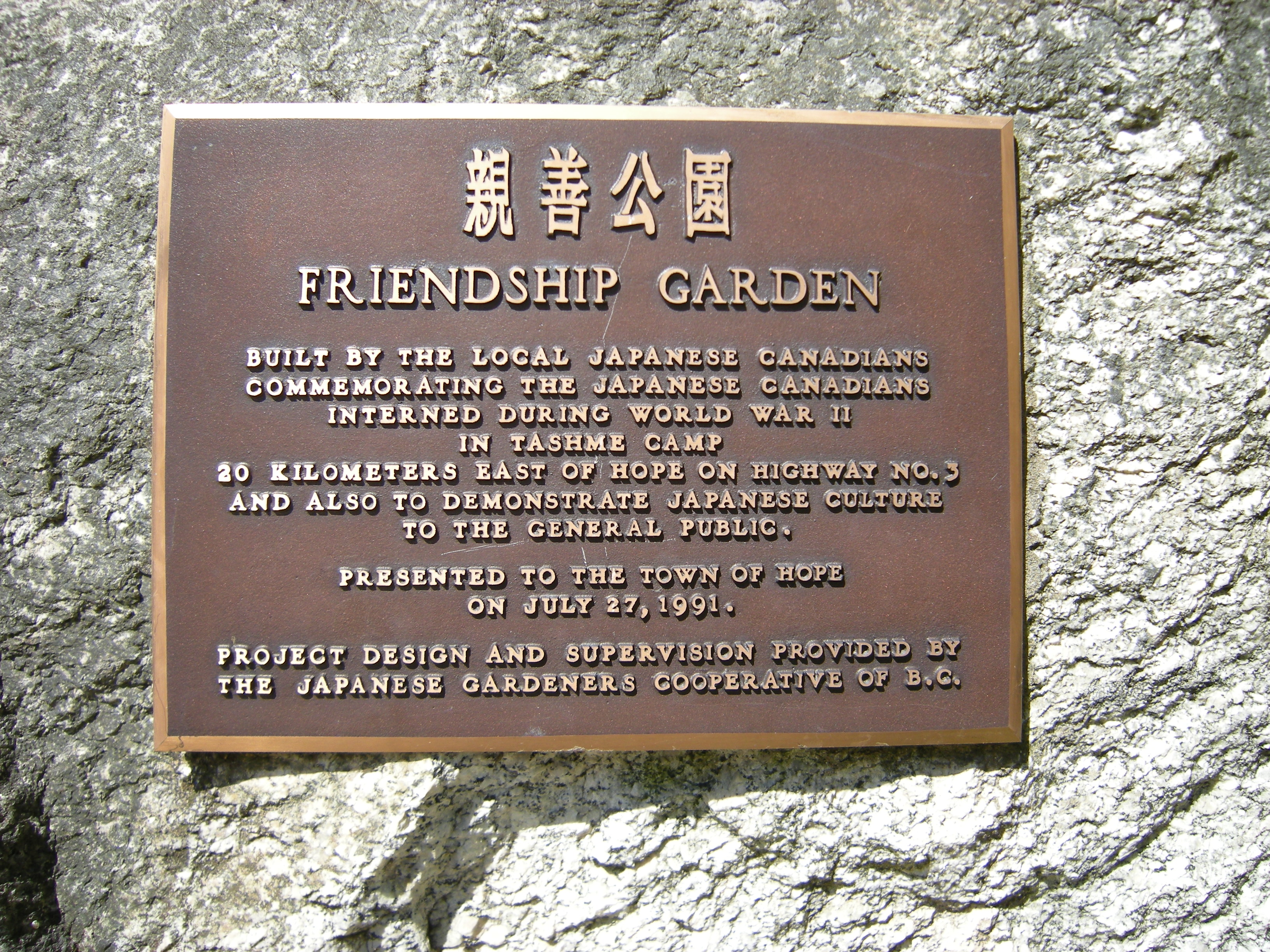
A plaque commemorating the Friendship Garden, a Japanese garden located in Hope, British Columbia.

Following public protest, the order-in-council that authorized the forced deportation was challenged on the basis that the forced deportation of Japanese Canadians was a crime against humanity and that a citizen could not be deported from his or her own country. The federal cabinet referred the constitutionality of the order-in-council to the Supreme Court of Canada for its opinion. In a five to two decision, the Court held that the law was valid. Three of the five found that the order was entirely valid. The other two found that the provision including both women and children as threats to national security was invalid. The matter was then appealed to the Judicial Committee of the Privy Council in Britain, at that time the court of last resort for Canada. The Judicial Committee upheld the decision of the Supreme Court. In 1947, due to various protests among politicians and academics, the federal cabinet revoked the legislation to repatriate the remaining Japanese Canadians to Japan. It was only in April 1949 that all restrictions were lifted from Japanese Canadians.

Issues surrounding the internment of Japanese Canadians also led to changes to Canadian immigration policy, with the legislation gaining momentum after a statement made by the Prime Minister on May 1, 1947:

There will, I am sure, be general agreement with the view that people of Canada do not wish, as a result of mass immigration, to make a fundamental alteration in the character of our population. Large-scale immigration from the orient would change the fundamental composition of the Canadian population ... The government, therefore, has no thought of making any changes in immigration regulations which would have consequences of the kind.

This reform to immigration policy was deemed necessary on two grounds: the inevitable post-war crisis of displaced persons from Europe, and the growing number of Canadians who wished to bring family to Canada following the war—the large number of war brides being the chief concern on this front. Mackenzie King believed that Canada was under no legal obligations to make such accommodations, only a moral obligation. During this time, the Canadian government also made provisions to begin the repeal of the discriminatory Chinese Immigration Act of 1923.

== Individuals interned ==
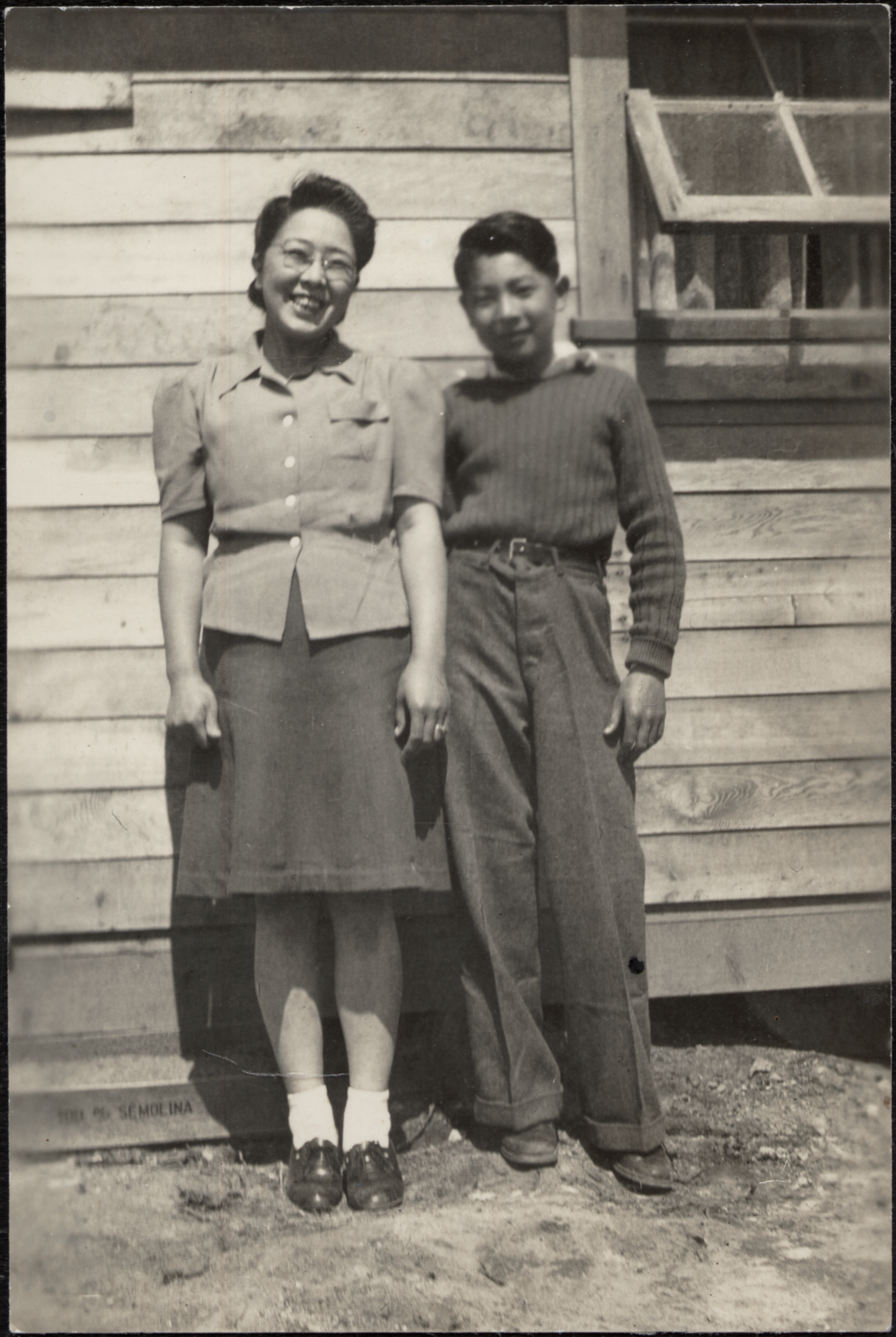
Raymond Moriyama and his mother Elsie Nobuko at the Slocan Internment Camp, British Columbia, Spring 1943.

Notable internees include:

- Ken Adachi
- Kazuo Hamasaki
- Tomekichi Homma
- Ted Itani
- Robert Ito
- Mary Kitagawa
- Joy Kogawa
- Nobuo Kubota
- Art Miki
- Roy Miki
- Masumi Mitsui
- Kenzo Mori
- Raymond Moriyama
- Kazuo Nakamura
- Gordon Goichi Nakayama
- Jesse Nishihata
- Shigetaka Sasaki
- Hide Hyodo Shimizu
- Masaru Shintani
- Thomas Shoyama
- David Suzuki
- Masao Takahashi
- Takao Tanabe
- Grace Eiko Thomson
- Kenryu Takashi Tsuji
- Masami Tsuruoka
- Irene Uchida
- Herb Wakabayashi
- Mel Wakabayashi
- Yuki Yoshida

== Redress ==
In 1947 the first "nationwide organization of Japanese Canadians", the National Japanese Canadian Citizens Association (NJCCA) was founded in Toronto on Labour Day weekend. The NJCCA carried on the work begun by the Japanese Canadian Citizens for Democracy (JCCD). The NJCCA was renamed the National Association of Japanese Canadians (NAJC) in 1980. In 1977, during the celebration of the 100th anniversary of the arrival of the first Japanese immigrant to Canada, discussions of redress began to have an effect. Meeting in basements and coffee houses, Japanese Canadian anger arose again, and the sense of shame was gradually replaced by one of indignation. This encouraged Japanese Canadians to fight for their rights and to gain compensation for what they had been through during the war.

In 1983, the NAJC mounted a major campaign for redress which demanded, among other things, a formal government apology, individual compensation, and the abolition of the War Measures Act.

Born in Canada, brought up on big-band jazz, Fred Astaire and the novels of Henry Rider Haggard, I had perceived myself to be as Canadian as the beaver. I hated rice. I had committed no crime. I was never charged, tried or convicted of anything. Yet I was fingerprinted and interned.

— Ken Adachi

To help their case, the NAJC hired Price Waterhouse to examine records to estimate the economic losses to Japanese Canadians resulting from property confiscations and loss of wages due to internment. Statisticians consulted the detailed records of Custodian of Enemy Property, and in their 1986 report, valued the total loss to Japanese Canadians at $443 million (in 1986 dollars).

On September 22, 1988, Prime Minister Brian Mulroney delivered an apology, and the Canadian government announced a compensation package, one month after President Ronald Reagan made similar gestures in the United States. The package for interned Japanese Canadians included $21,000 to each surviving internee, and the reinstatement of Canadian citizenship to those who were deported to Japan. Following Mulroney's apology, the Japanese Canadian Redress Agreement was established in 1988, along with the Japanese Canadian Redress Foundation (JCRF; 1988–2002), to issue redress payments for internment victims, with the intent of funding education. However, of the $12 million community fund, it was agreed upon by the JCRF board members that $8 million would go towards building homes and service centres for Issei senior citizens. Due to the fact that Issei had been stripped of their wealth, property, and livelihoods during internment, it was a main concern of the JCRF to provide aid to their community elders. Nothing was given for those that had been interned and died before compensation was paid out.

Following redress, there was increased education in the public education system about internment. By using this outlet, Canadians were able to confront the social injustice of Japanese Internment in a way that accepts those affected and aids in creating a community that values social reconstruction, equality, and fair treatment. Public education provides an outlet for wronged individuals to share their stories and begin to heal, which is a necessary process to repair their trust in a government that can care for and protect their individual and cultural rights. "The first step to recognition of Japanese-Canadian redress as an issue for all Canadians was recognition that it was an issue for all Japanese Canadians, not in the interests of retribution for their 'race', nor only in the interests of justice, but in recognition of a need to assert principles of human rights so that racism and other forms of discrimination might be challenged." The question of whether Canada and Japanese Canadians can truly move on from the past has been explored in first-hand accounts and literature, such as Joy Kogawa's Obasan.

The Nikkei Memorial Internment Centre in New Denver, British Columbia, is an interpretive centre that honours the history of interned Japanese Canadians, many of whom were confined nearby.

== Cultural references ==
The internment of Japanese Canadians is the subject matter of the folk song "Kiri's Piano" on the album My Skies by James Keelaghan.

Writer Joy Kogawa is often considered a prominent chronicler of the internment of Japanese Canadians, having written about the period in works including the novels Obasan and Itsuka, and the augmented reality application East of the Rockies.

== See also ==
- Canada in World War II
- German Canadian internment
- Italian Canadian internment
- Ukrainian Canadian internment
- Anti-Chinese sentiment in Canada
  - Chinese head tax in Canada
- Japanese Canadian War Memorial
- Internment Camp in Vernon, BC
- Anti-Chinese sentiment in the United States
- Anti-Japanese sentiment
  - Anti-Japanese sentiment in the United States
    - Internment of Japanese Americans
- Internment of German Americans
- Internment of Italian Americans
- Racism in North America
  - Racism in the United States
- Featherston prisoner of war camp (New Zealand)
- Minoru: Memory of Exile
- Sinophobia
