= Minoru: Memory of Exile =

- Directed by: Michael Fukushima
- Produced by: William Pettigrew
- Narrated by: Minoru Fukushima
- Production company: National Film Board of Canada
- Release date: 1992
- Running time: 18 min 45 s
- Country: Canada

Minoru: Memory of Exile is a 1992 animated documentary about the Japanese Canadian internment by Michael Fukushima. The film recreates the experiences of the filmmaker's father, Minoru, who as a child was sent along with his family and thousands of other Japanese Canadians to internment camps in the interior of British Columbia.

The film explores the narrow range of options available to internees after the war, with Minuro's father choosing the option of repatriation to Japan, even though his children were born in Canada. The film concludes with a description of the Canadian government's redress of 1988, which took place one year after the filmmaker's mother's death.

Produced by William Pettigrew for the National Film Board of Canada, Minoru: Memory of Exile combines animation with archival material, and was narrated by Minoru Fukushima. The 19 minute film received several awards, including Best Short Documentary at Hot Docs.

The film received some production funding from the National Association of Japanese Canadians (NAJC), and has been screened at national and regional Japanese Canadian events, such as the NAJC's 1992 HomeComing conference. It has also been distributed by the NFB to Canadian schools.
