= Kazuo Hamasaki =

Kazuo "Shin Sen" Hamasaki
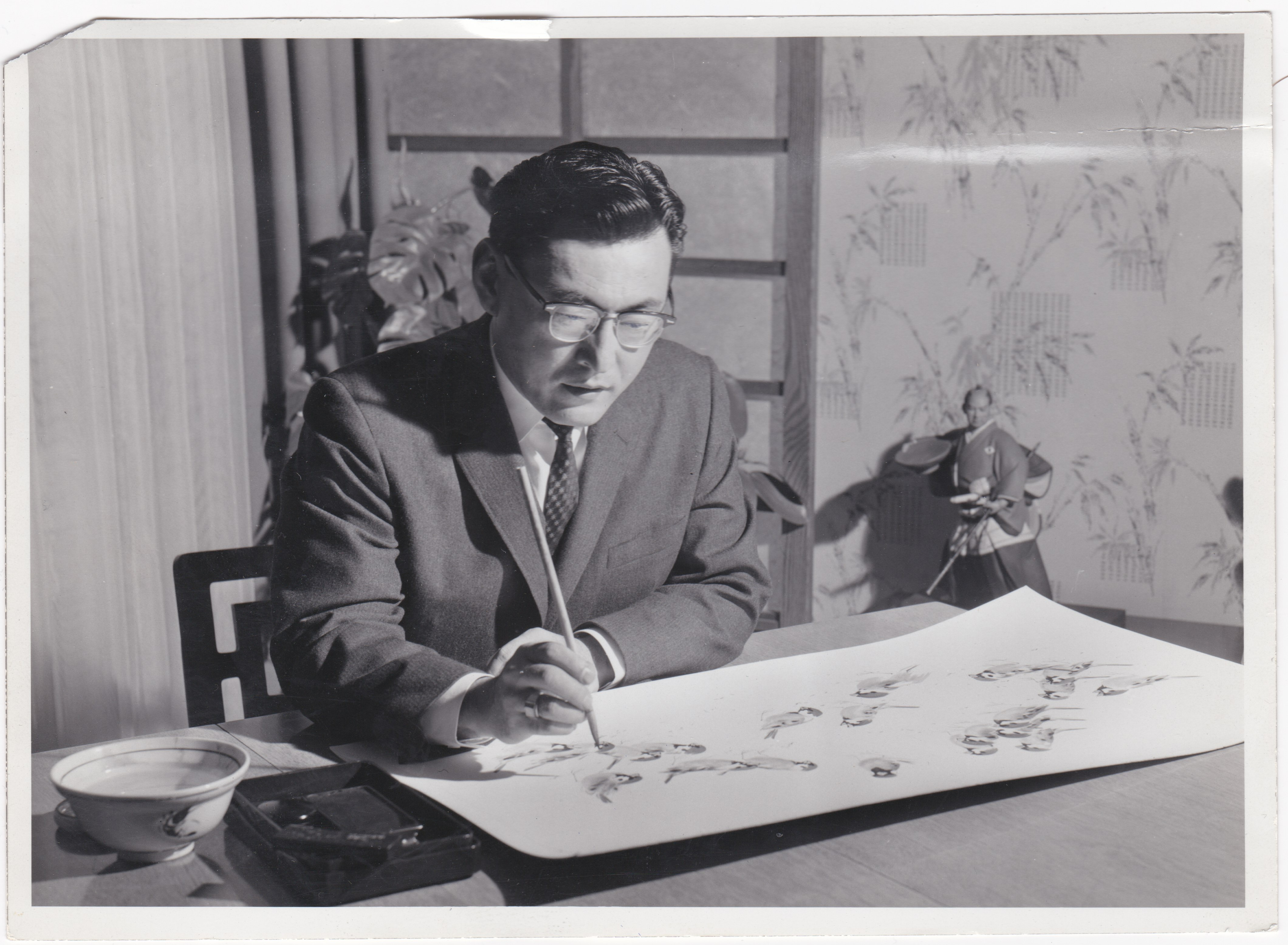
- Born: 1925; Prince Rupert, British Columbia, Canada
- Died: 2005 (aged 79–80)
- Education: Josui Kai Nanga Society
- Elected: President of the Society of Canadian Artists

Kazuo Hamasaki (1925–2005) was a Canadian artist of Japanese heritage, known for to reconciling the Japanese tradition with his Canadian heritage combining both Canadian and Japanese watercolour techniques. He was a president of the Society of Canadian Artists. "My aim has always been to retain the traditions, yet advance forward to new horizons through the use of western pigment, paper and subject matter." Counterbalancing a "free and direct emotional style with a strict technique and use of tone. The work, richly influenced by Zen philosophy, requires hours of quiet observance to remain faithful to the resulting vision."

Hamasaki was influenced by the 16th century Japanese Nangan school of painting, which he combined with his Canadian heritage. Janet Bonellie, in her piece "Reflection" in Artmagazine 7, states that Hamasaki's work combines strict technical work with the use of a free and direct emotional style. Hamasaki was trained in methods of the Josui Kai Nanga Society which gave him the artistic name "Shin Sen", even though he had never having been to Japan.

Hamasaki, along with his family, was interned during the Second World War in British Columbia, Canada. In the posthumous exhibition "Play Misty For Me: The Paintings of Kazuo Hamasaki at the Woodstock Art Gallery", guest curator Bryce Kanbara commented on Hamasaki's work, stating that by combining his internment experience with his paintings gave his work historical significance. "Those are the aspects that make his works interesting and separates it from a Japanese show". His work is especially known for the "sumi-e" style of landscapes showing lifting or falling mist or close ups of flowers and leaves.

As president of the Society of Canadian Artists in 1974 he was the representative of the first cultural art exchange between Canada and Hawaii.
