= Custodian of Enemy Property (Canada) =

Former government agency

In Canada, the Office of the Custodian of Enemy Property, attached to the Secretary of State for Canada, was established in 1916 and existed until 1985, dealing with the property of Canada's enemies in both World Wars as well as with the seized property of Japanese Canadians.

== History ==
=== 1916-1939 ===
The office of Custodian was originally created in 1916, during the First World War, deriving its authority from the War Measures Act and the Consolidated Orders Respecting Trading with the Enemy, and its functions included the seizure and liquidation of enemy property. This followed the adoption of the UK trading with the enemy restrictions enacted in 1914, which had been incorporated into Canadian law in 1914 by order in council. From 1916 to 1919, the Minister of Finance and the Secretary of State had joint responsibility for acting as Custodian.

From 1920 to 1939, it served the function of administering war claims and reparations. Under legislation authorizing the conclusion of treaties of peace the Treaty of Peace (Germany) Order, 1920 was issued to create the Office, under the authority of the Secretary of State as sold custodian. The Office acted as one of the "clearing offices" authorized under Article 296 of the Treaty of Versailles for the collection and payment of enemy debts, and Article 297 authorized Canada to keep and liquidate any German property in Canada. Investigations and recommendations respecting claims for reparations were undertaken by the separately appointed Royal Commission on Reparations, chaired by Errol McDougall.

=== 1939-1985 ===
With the outbreak of the Second World War, the Regulations respecting Trading with the Enemy, 1939 expanded the scope of the Office. From 1942 the role of the Custodian was expanded to include the administration of property seized from Japanese Canadians.

In the postwar period, the Custodian had the responsibility for resolving Canadian War Claims, and the resolution of outstanding wartime property issues. This latter process was complicated by the implications of the large scale nationalization of property in Eastern Europe by the Communist regimes established in the post war period under Soviet auspices. The WWII regulations were continued on a temporary basis following the end of hostilities, and were continued in 1947 by the Trading with the Enemy (Transitional Powers) Act. The Act ceased to have effect at the end of September 1992, and was consequently repealed in 1996.

The Office ceased operations in 1985. Its files were transferred to Library and Archives Canada, but there is evidence that some have been destroyed without assessing their historical value. The Office never produced annual reports outlining its activities.

== Notable custodians ==
- Claude C. Robinson: ice hockey and sports executive, inductee into the Hockey Hall of Fame, and the Canadian Olympic Hall of Fame

== See also ==
- Custodian of Enemy Property
- Japanese Canadian Internment
