= Nikkei Internment Memorial Centre =

Museum in New Denver, British Columbia, Canada

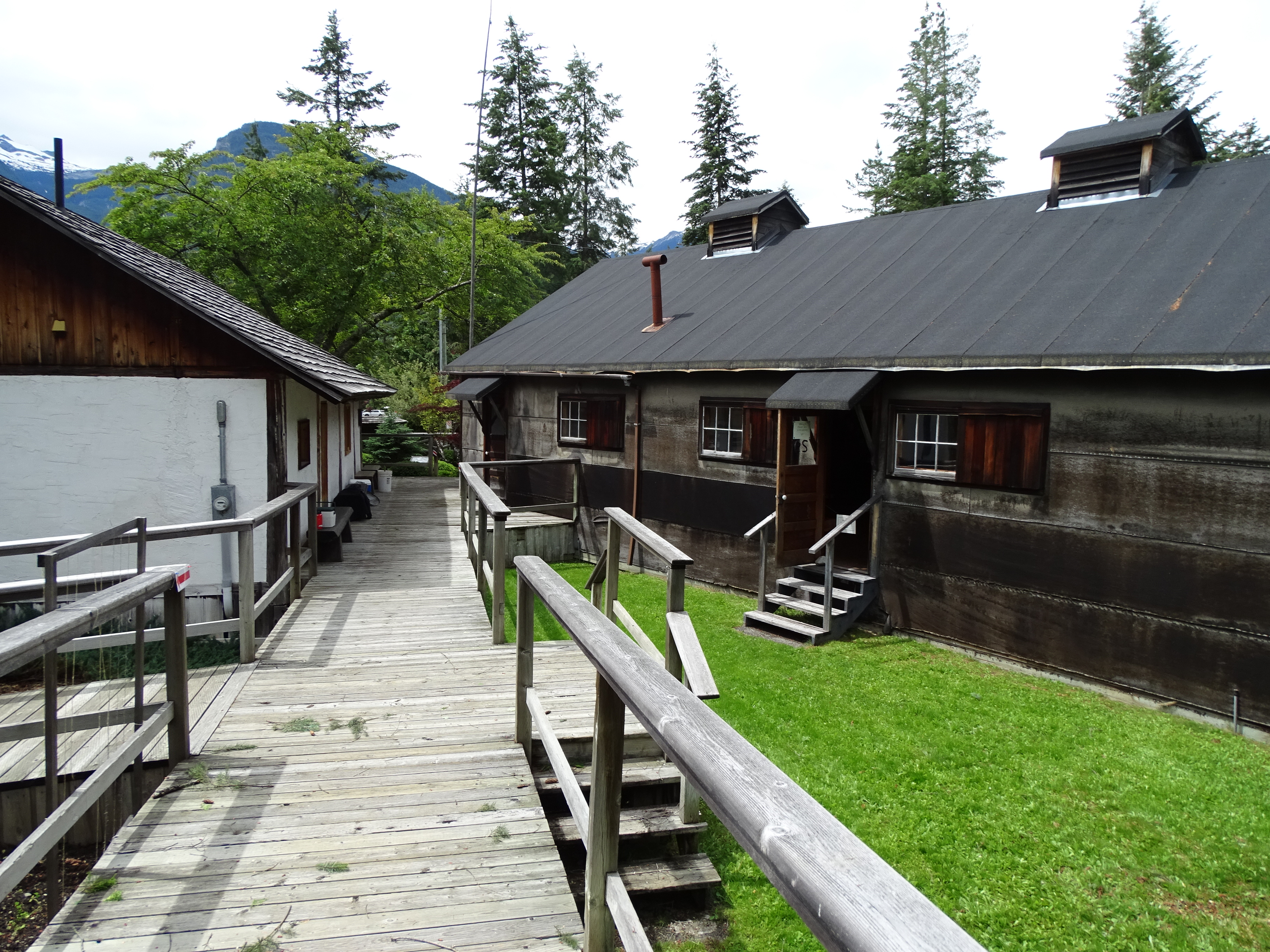

- Location in British Columbia
- 49°59′12″N 117°22′31″W
- Location: New Denver, British Columbia, Canada

History
- Built: 1942
- Built for: British Columbia Security Commission
- Original use: Japanese Canadian internment

Site notes
- Current use: Museum
- Website: newdenver.ca/nikkei/

National Historic Site of Canada
- Official name: Nikkei Internment Memorial Centre National Historic Site of Canada
- Designated: 8 June 2007

Nikkei Internment Memorial Centre is a museum that preserves and interprets one of ten Canadian concentration camps where more than 27,000 Japanese Canadians were incarcerated by the Canadian government during and after World War II (1942 to 1949). The centre was designated a National Historic Site of Canada in 2007.

== Description ==
The museum is open seasonally from 1 May to 30 September. The site consists of five buildings, of which three are original shacks built to house the interned. Many artifacts such as stoves and furnishings are preserved, as are some personal effects of the people displaced. It also features a Japanese garden designed by Roy Sumi, a former supervisor of the Nitobe Memorial Garden at the University of British Columbia.

== Affiliations ==
The Museum is affiliated with the CMA, CHIN, and Virtual Museum of Canada.
