= Soldier Settlement Board =

Canadian veterans' settlement scheme

The Soldier Settlement Board was established in Canada in 1917 to assist returned servicemen in setting up farms.

The Board would give assistance to any man who had served abroad with the Canadian Expeditionary Force, to any former Canadian serviceman who had not left Canada but was in receipt of a service pension, to any member of the Imperial, Dominion or Allied forces who had lived in Canada before the war, or to any member of the Imperial or Dominion forces who had served outside their own country and who had since emigrated to Canada. The last category was required to first work on a Canadian farm for a time to prove that they had the capability to farm on their own, to have sufficient working capital to establish themselves, and to make a down payment of 20 per cent for land, stock, implements and buildings.

Applicants for a loan were first investigated as to their fitness, moral character, assets and abilities. If they did not have sufficient farming experience, they could be asked to work on a farm first for a period, and until 1 May 1921 pay and allowances could be granted for such training, especially to men with families. Special training centers for this purpose were established in some places, but these were all closed in 1921.

By 1921, nearly 60,000 applications for loans had been made, of which 43,000 had been deemed suitable. Loans were made at 5 per cent interest. They were repayable in six annual installments in the case of loans for stock and equipment and in 25 annual installments in the case of loans for land and buildings.

Loans on land to be purchased could be made up to a total of $7,500, including:

- up to $4,500 for land
- up to $2,000 for stock and equipment
- up to $1,000 for permanent improvements

Loans on land already owned by the applicant could be made up to a total of $5,000, including:

- up to $3,500 for removal of encumbrances
- up to $2,000 for stock and equipment
- up to $1,000 for permanent improvements

Alberta and Saskatchewan were the most popular provinces for settlement, followed by Manitoba, British Columbia and Ontario. There were far fewer applications for the other provinces.

All Dominion lands within fifteen miles (24 km) of a railway were reserved for veterans. In the three Prairie Provinces, every eligible soldier was entitled to a grant of 160 acres (0.65 km^{2}) and also had the right of any civilian to homestead a further 160 acres (0.65 km^{2}).

Other Dominion lands were also opened for settlement, including Forest Reserves and Indian reserves.

All settlers helped by the Soldier Settlement Board were regularly visited by field supervisors to check on their progress and give advice. A Home Service Branch was established to give help and advice to wives, including free courses in home economics and farm subjects.

== See also ==
- Department of Soldiers' Civil Re-establishment
- Dominion Land Survey
