= Sunshine Valley, British Columbia =

Sunshine Valley
- Unincorporated
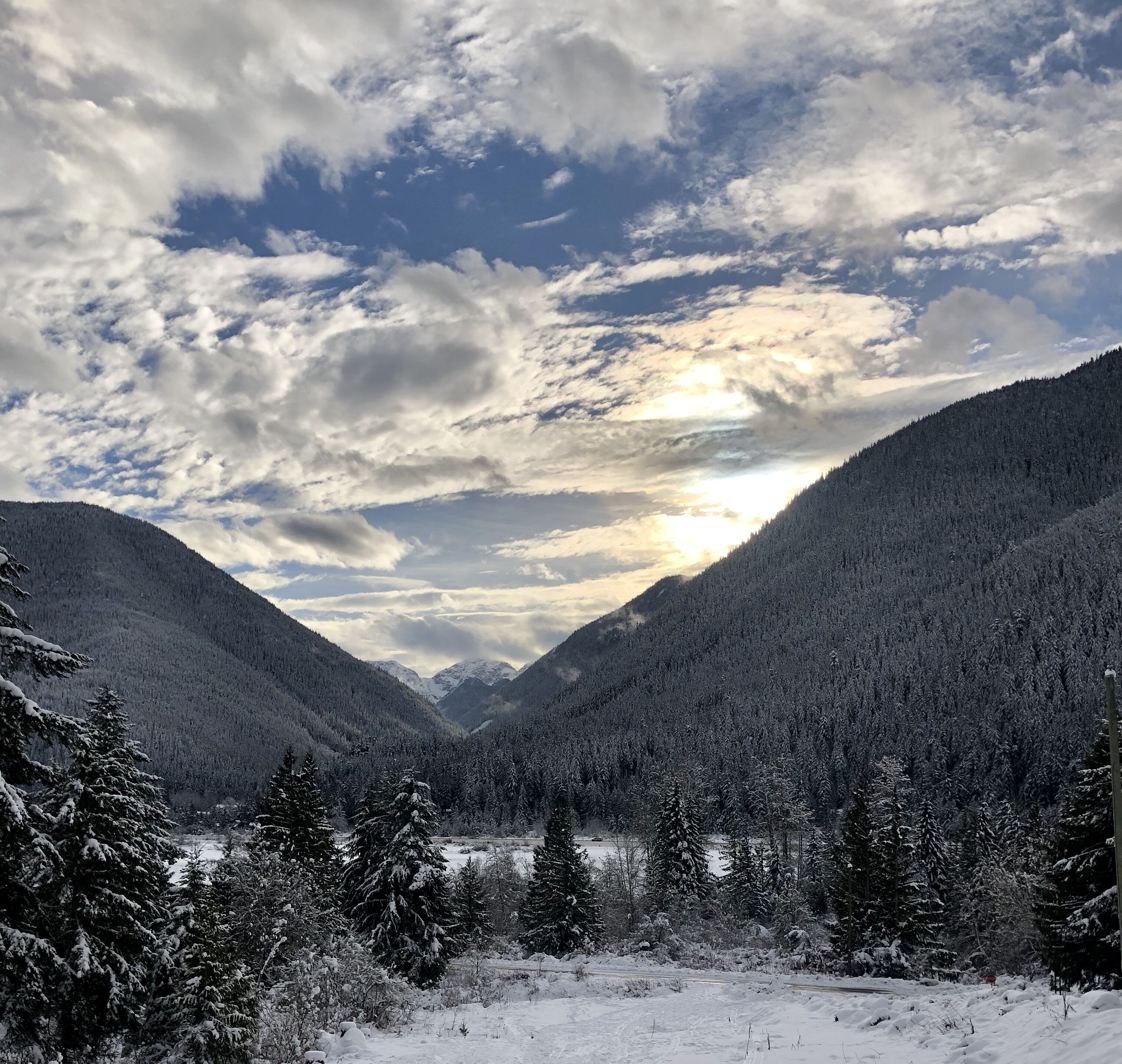

- Location of Sunshine Valley in British Columbia
- Coordinates: 49°16′00″N 121°14′00″W
- Country: Canada
- Province: British Columbia
- Region: Fraser Valley
- Regional District: Fraser Valley Regional District
- Established: 1942

Population (2021)
  - Total: 208
- Time zone: UTC-8 (Pacific Standard Time)
  - Summer (DST): UTC-7 (Pacific Daylight Time)
- Area codes: 250, 778
- Highways: Highway 3 (Crowsnest Highway)
- Website: https://sunshinevalleyliving.com

Sunshine Valley is an unincorporated community consisting of cabins, tiny homes, and RV parks on the Crowsnest Highway between the town of Hope (NW) and the entrance to Manning Park in the Cascade Mountains of British Columbia. The community has its own volunteer fire department (SVVFD), recreation centre, heated outdoor pool, and playground. As of 2021, the population of Sunshine Valley is 208.

== History ==
During World War II, Sunshine Valley was named Tashme. The area was used as a Japanese Canadian internment camp. Opened September 8, 1942, it was designed to house 500 families, making it one of the largest and last camps in B.C., and was located just outside the 100-mile "quarantine" zone from which all Japanese Canadians were removed. Men housed in the camp were employed in the construction of the highway during the war.

After the war, the site was sold off and has continued in existence as a proposed Boy's Town, the Allison Lumber Company (a combined lumber and mine venture) and then a small campground and recreational community. It served as the basetown for the small Silvertip Ski Area which was located at the head of Tearse Creek, a tributary of the Upper Sumallo River which flows north into the town from the south and upon entering the town, turns southeast and enters Manning Park. In Hope, there is a Tashme Friendship Garden in memory of the camp and its residents.

== In popular culture ==
The Tashme Internment Camp is one of the settings in the 2018 novel Floating City by author Kerri Sakamoto.

== Climate ==
Climate data for Sunshine Valley (Hope Slide), elevation 685 m (2,247 ft), (1981–2010)
Month	Jan	Feb	Mar	Apr	May	Jun	Jul	Aug	Sep	Oct	Nov	Dec	Year
Record high °C (°F)	12.0 (53.6)	16.0 (60.8)	23.5 (74.3)	28.5 (83.3)	32.2 (90.0)	33.0 (91.4)	35.0 (95.0)	34.5 (94.1)	34.5 (94.1)	26.2 (79.2)	17.2 (63.0)	12.2 (54.0)	35.0 (95.0)
Mean daily maximum °C (°F)	1.4 (34.5)	3.6 (38.5)	6.9 (44.4)	11.1 (52.0)	14.8 (58.6)	17.7 (63.9)	20.9 (69.6)	21.5 (70.7)	17.7 (63.9)	11.0 (51.8)	4.2 (39.6)	1.0 (33.8)	11.0 (51.8)
Daily mean °C (°F)	−1.8 (28.8)	−0.3 (31.5)	2.5 (36.5)	5.8 (42.4)	9.4 (48.9)	12.5 (54.5)	15.1 (59.2)	15.3 (59.5)	11.8 (53.2)	6.5 (43.7)	1.2 (34.2)	−1.8 (28.8)	6.4 (43.4)
Mean daily minimum °C (°F)	−4.9 (23.2)	−4.3 (24.3)	−1.9 (28.6)	0.5 (32.9)	3.9 (39.0)	7.2 (45.0)	9.1 (48.4)	8.9 (48.0)	5.8 (42.4)	2.0 (35.6)	−1.8 (28.8)	−4.5 (23.9)	1.7 (35.0)
Record low °C (°F)	−27.8 (−18.0)	−25.1 (−13.2)	−22.2 (−8.0)	−7.8 (18.0)	−4.0 (24.8)	−1.7 (28.9)	1.4 (34.5)	0.0 (32.0)	−3.3 (26.1)	−18.6 (−1.5)	−28.2 (−18.8)	−29.6 (−21.3)	−29.6 (−21.3)
Average precipitation mm (inches)	175.4 (6.91)	104.8 (4.13)	98.2 (3.87)	77.3 (3.04)	68.6 (2.70)	64.4 (2.54)	48.5 (1.91)	41.3 (1.63)	61.7 (2.43)	134.1 (5.28)	202.5 (7.97)	143.6 (5.65)	1,220.4 (48.06)
Average snowfall cm (inches)	68.9 (27.1)	44.7 (17.6)	40.0 (15.7)	15.7 (6.2)	1.9 (0.7)	0.0 (0.0)	0.0 (0.0)	0.0 (0.0)	0.0 (0.0)	3.9 (1.5)	42.0 (16.5)	70.6 (27.8)	287.7 (113.1)
Average precipitation days (≥ 0.2 mm)	19.9	15.3	18.1	18.1	18.1	15.7	11.2	9.7	12.1	18.7	20.7	17.4	195
Average snowy days (≥ 0.2 cm)	11.8	8.7	8.3	4.2	0.85	0.04	0.0	0.0	0.0	1.3	7.5	11.6	54.29
Source: Environment and Climate Change Canada
