= Japanese Canadians in British Columbia =

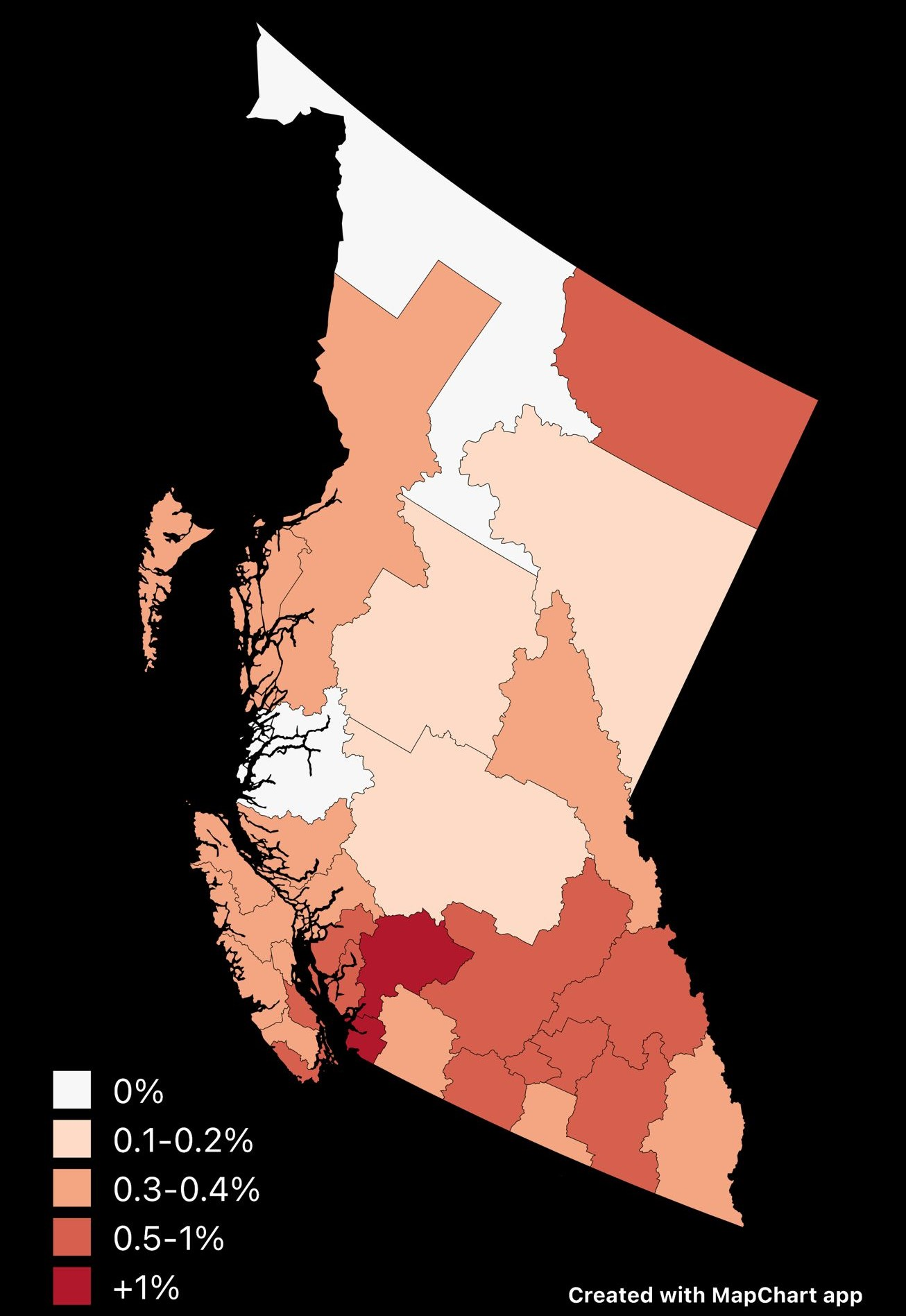
- Population distribution of Japanese Canadians in British Columbia by census division, 2021 census

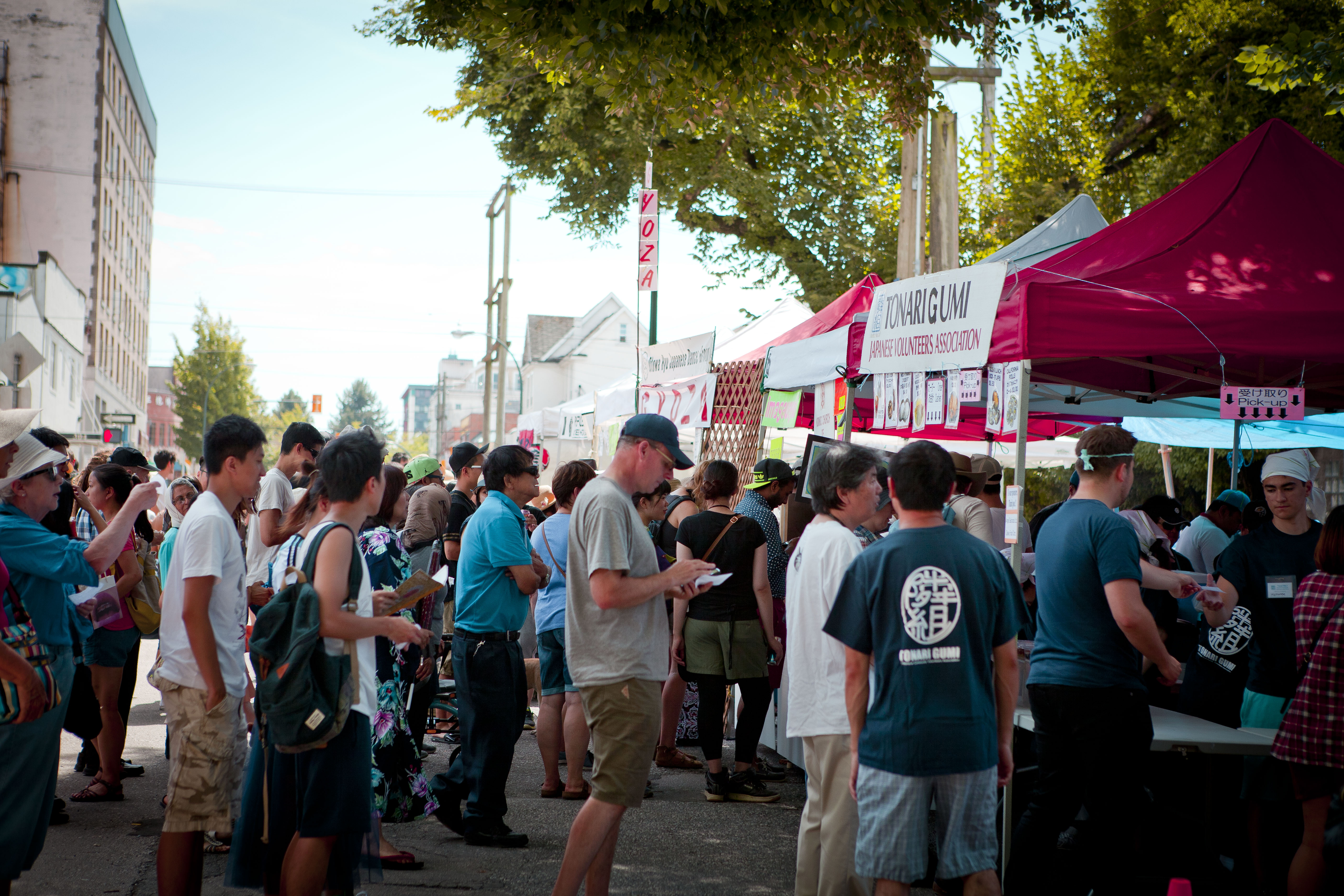
Powell Street Festival in Vancouver, the largest Japanese Canadian festival

The history of Japanese people in British Columbia began with the arrival of Manzo Nagano in New Westminster in 1877. Prior to 1942, British Columbia was home to 90% of all Japanese in Canada. In 2001, 44% of all Japanese Canadians lived in British Columbia, or about 1% of the province's total population.

== History ==
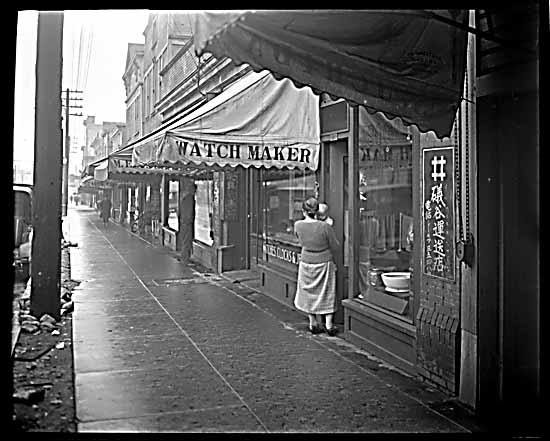
Powell Street in Japantown, 1928

The first Japanese in Canada was Manzo Nagano, who stowed away on a British ship and arrived in New Westminster in 1877. He would eventually settle in Victoria, British Columbia. During the 1890s, Issei (term for Japanese immigrant in North America) established themselves on Powell Street, building stores, boarding houses, and other businesses, adjacent to Hastings Mill, a major employer of Japanese. The neighbourhood was the largest settlement of Japanese Canadians prior to World War Two.

=== 1902 Royal Proclamation ===
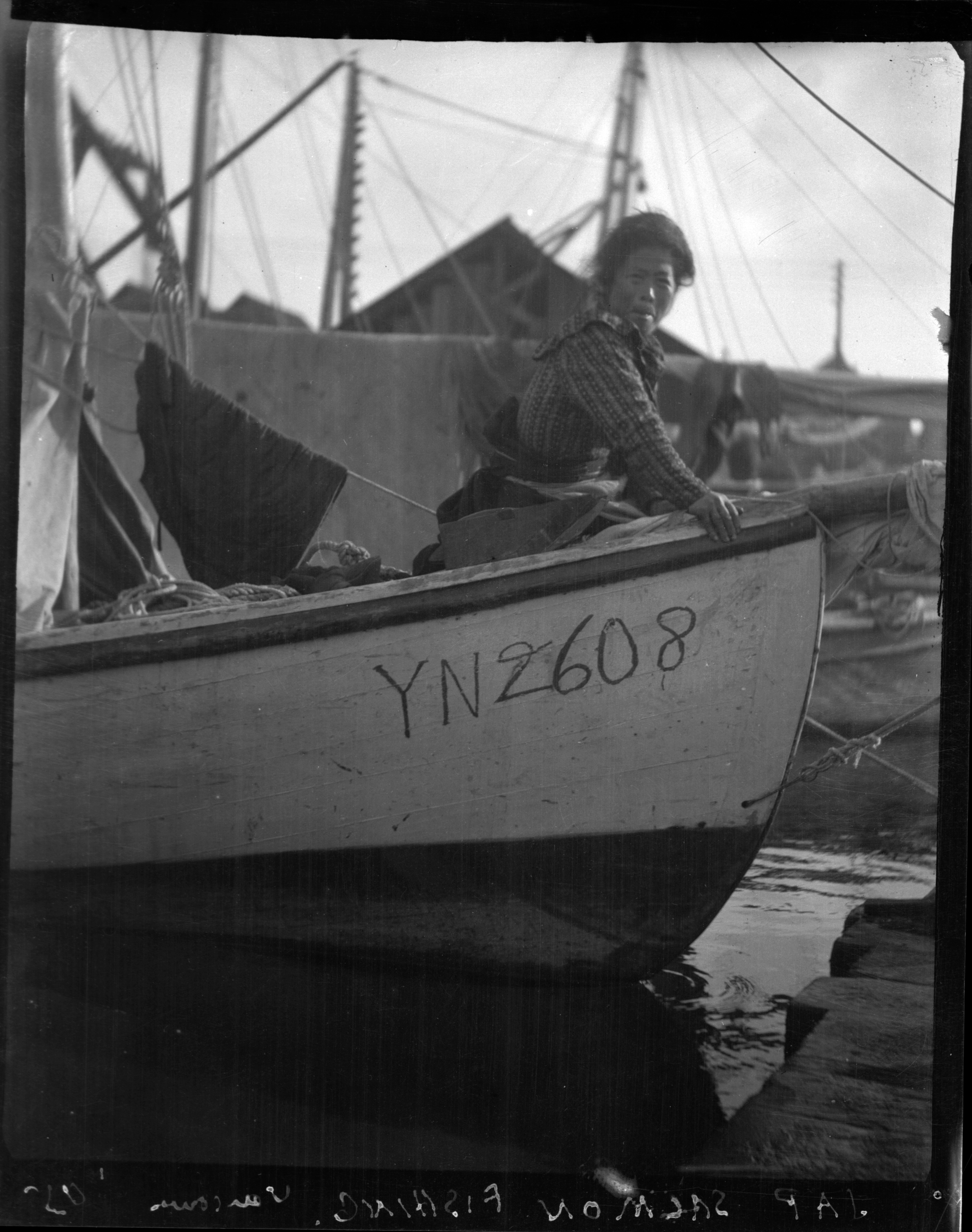
Japanese Canadian woman aboard a salmon fishing boat, Vancouver, British Columbia, 1905

In 1902 the Canadian government published the Report of the Royal Commission on Chinese and Japanese Immigration. This proclamation is the result of an investigation and analysis of the perceived issues from increasing Japanese and Chinese immigration, especially in matters relating to commerce. Special attention was given to the fishing and lumber industries where Japanese labourers played a prominent role. The investigation gathered testimonials from locals on their opinion on Japanese labourers. In the Fraser River area, many White and Indigenous fishermen opined that there were more canneries and fisherman licenses than can be environmentally and commercially sustained. They largely blamed this imbalance on increasing Japanese fishermen. Indigenous fisherman stated that they were taking the place of White people by taking the dominant role in the fishing industry. While the Japanese were viewed as somewhat better than Chinese labourers, who were facing similar discrimination, the large numbers of Japanese migrants were giving locals anxiety (between 1896 and 1901, 13193 Japanese migrants landed in Victoria). One mentioned issue was the different way in which Japanese fishermen negotiated sales and price of their fish. While White and Indigenous fishermen negotiated individually with the canneries, Japanese fishermen were often part of organized groups where a boss would negotiate prices for the whole group. This practice had a standardizing effect on fish prices which, along with increased competition, lessened what White and Indigenous fishermen were able to earn. Furthermore, there was particular concern about growing Japanese involvement in boat construction, a particularly sensitive and important industry. In the lumber industry, there were similar sentiments as Japanese laborers were paid less than their White counterparts which made them attractive for mills. In one mill, Japanese workers were paid $1–1.25 while White workers were paid $2–2.25 a day. While many of the respondents to the commission showed anxiety and hostility, most acknowledged that Japanese labour was satisfactory in quantity and quality. In addition, the high number of Japanese workers made them integral to many local industries such as the lumber industry.

=== Early 20th century ===
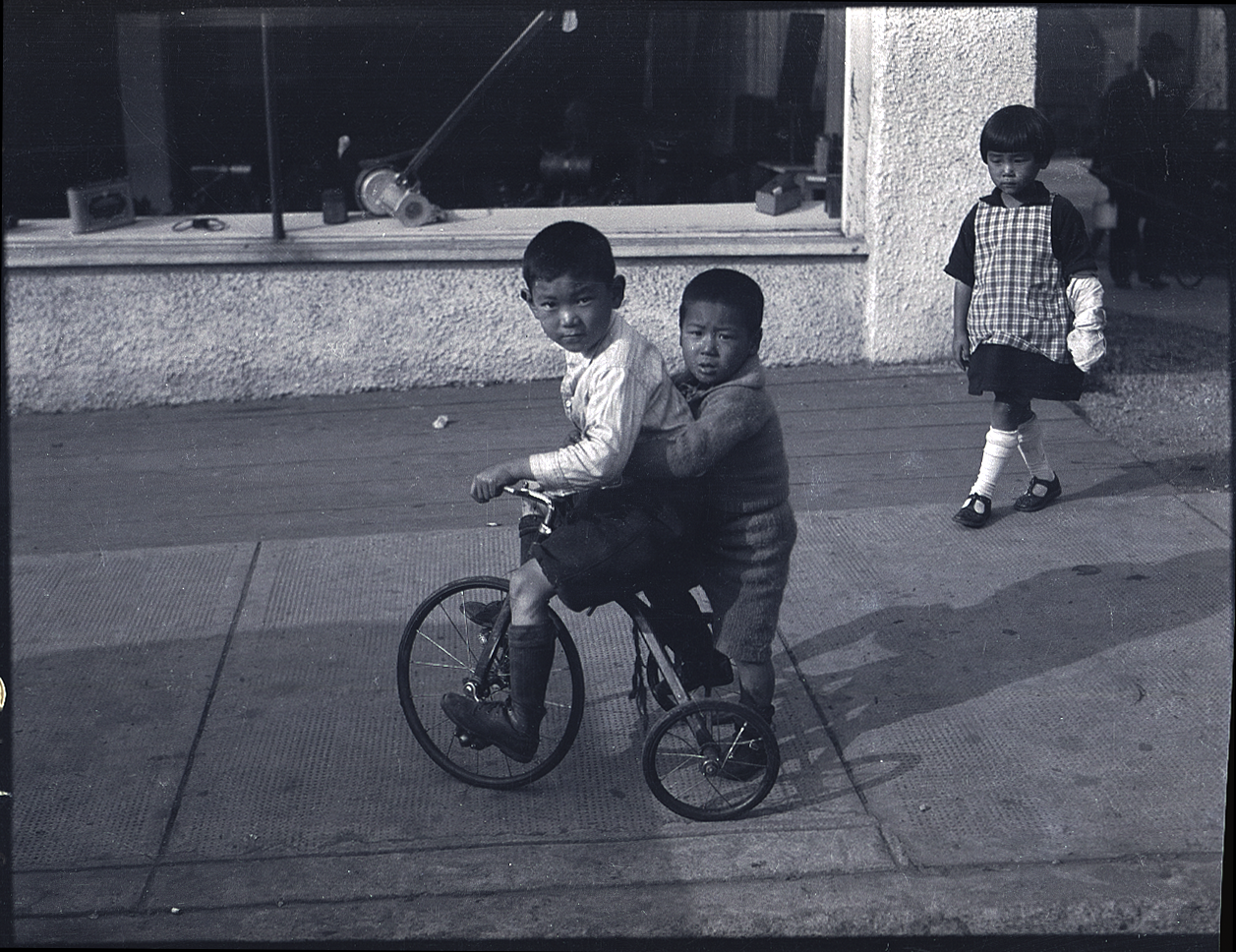
Two Japanese Canadian boys riding a tricycle with girl looking on, Vancouver, British Columbia, 1927

In 1907, an anti-Asian riot broke out in Chinese and Japanese sections of Vancouver due to the increased presence of Japanese who, in 1907, had entered Canada in a record number of 7,000. Labour unions and small business groups banded together to form the Vancouver branch of the Asiatic Exclusion League (AEL), an organization against the increase of Asian immigrants in Canada and the US. The Japanese, due to their numbers and the economic competition they posed were seen as a particular threat. A public demonstration by the AEL on September 7, 1907 turned into a riot. Rioters smashed many windows in parts of Chinatown, and then moved on to Japantown. Four waves of attacks ensued, with the rioters being repulsed by the armed Japanese residents who had received warning of the attacks in Chinatown. In spite of inflicting a number of injuries upon the mob, more than 50 stores and businesses on Powell Street had their windows broken resulting in thousands of dollars of damage.

Similar events happened in other cities on the West Coast in Canada and the US as anti-immigrant sentiment, especially against Asians, became common. Significant pressure was being applied in both countries to restrict immigration. Following the riots, Japanese immigration to Canada was restricted to 400 male immigrants and domestic servants per year in 1908 under a gentlemen's agreement with Japan. Immigration was further restricted to 150 annually in 1923.

In 1916, over 200 Japanese volunteers attempted to enlist as a corps in the Canadian Army. When refused by the British Columbia provincial government, they traveled to Alberta to enlist as individuals. Eventually, 196 Japanese were sent overseas. In 1931, surviving veterans were given the right to vote as they were not allowed to vote prior to that.

=== Second generation Japanese immigrants ===
In 1934, there were 10,965 Japanese who were born in British Columbia with 135 being third-generation. The majority of the population (6,176) lived in the rural districts while the rest (4,598) lived in urban cities, mainly Victoria and Metro Vancouver. Most second-generation Japanese had integrated well into their new country and embraced their new identity as Japanese-Canadians. Only 14.5 percent of the population had been to Japan and 13.5 and 16 percent of the urban and rural populations respectively expressed interest in moving to Japan. Many Canadian-born Japanese however had their birth registered by their parents in both Japan and Victoria, giving them resident status in both Canada and Japan. This was done because of a few reasons including the possibility of moving to Japan in the future and language and institutional barriers to government services/administration. Upon realizing their dual-national status, many second-generation Japanese immigrants withdrew their records from Japan to further reflect their new nationality. They saw dual nationality as “unnecessary, unethical, and detrimental to the future life of those Canadians of Japanese origin as British subjects residing in BC.”

=== Occupations ===
93.2 percent of second-generation Japanese Canadians were employed in unskilled and semi-skilled labour by 1934. This is in part due to legal restrictions. By the 1930s, anti-Asian sentiments were still strong in British Columbia which led to occupational isolation for Japanese Canadians. The Revised Statute of BC of 1924, Chapter 76, section 5A disqualifies “any person of Japanese, naturalized or not” from voting in any election which by extension also prohibits them from entering professions and positions including: being elected to the provincial legislature, being nominated for municipal office, being nominated at as a school trustee, jury service, legal professions, pharmaceutical professions, license for hand-logging and contractor for public works.

In addition to legal restrictions, there was also a general lack of encouragement for many Japanese Canadians with regards to professional development given that fishing and farm work were the traditional line of work for many immigrants in Canada. Furthermore, most highly educated Japanese Canadians moved to Japan for work.

== Internment ==
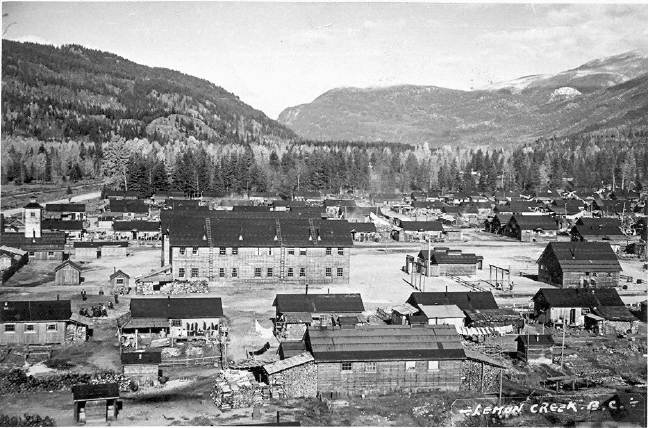
Lemon Creek Internment Camp, 1944-1945

When the Pacific war erupted, more than 8,500, or ⅓ of Japanese Canadians lived in the Greater Vancouver Area. More than half of these lived in the Powell Street district. Following the War Measures Act, all people of Japanese descent were declared “enemy aliens” of Canada. In February 1942, the Canadian government ordered “all persons of Japanese racial origin” to leave the 100-mile area along the coast. The Custodian of Enemy Property seized all property deemed to be dangerous, including boats, cars, radios, cameras, and was authorized to hold all land and property in trust. During the construction of the internment camps, the Pacific National Exhibition was designated a holding and distribution centre for Japanese Canadians. 22,000 Japanese Canadians—comprising over 90% of the total Japanese Canadian population—from British Columbia were forcibly relocated and interned in the name of national security. The majority were Canadian citizens by birth. In March 1949, four years after the war was over, the last of the wartime restrictions and the War Measures Act were lifted, and Japanese Canadians were allowed to travel freely and return to the West Coast.

=== Dispossession ===
After the internment of Japanese Canadians, the federal government made the decision to force the sale of all property of all British Columbians of Japanese ancestry regardless of status. The Vancouver Town Planning Commission played a large role in initiating the sales, bringing attention to the deteriorating “slum” properties surrounding Japantown. The Town Planning Commission hoped to replace the slum with more suitable land use, however, the federal government ultimately took the dispossession into their own hands, choosing not to demolish the area realizing that many of the buildings were owned by non-Japanese Canadians. Glenn McPherson, the founding Director of the Vancouver office of the Custodian of Enemy Property, was a key advocate in the dispossession and liquidation of Japanese-Canadian-owned property. He pushed for forced sales to higher authorities and wrote the first draft of the government order authorizing the ‘‘liquidation’’ of Japanese-Canadian-owned property. He had written to Ephraim Coleman, the undersecretary of state, that the Japanese-Canadian-owned buildings should be sold off as quickly as possible, as deterioration of buildings would lower property values and might soon be ‘‘demolished by neighbours in need of firewood”. Gordon Murchison, the director of the Soldier Settlement Board recommended that all property holdings should be sold because of the deterioration of the value. On January 11, 1943, ministers involved in the drafting of the Orders in Council recommended that the federal government apply ‘‘the principle of liquidation’’ to all urban property; rural properties were to be placed under the control of the Custodian”. This was signed into law by the Privy Council eight days later. Japanese property in British Columbia was effectively sold off thereby eliminating the thriving Japanese community in the province.

=== Self-supporting projects ===
In 1942 groups of Japanese Canadians who were evicted from their homes rented residential properties in Christina Lake, Bridge River, McGillvray Falls, Lillooet, Taylor Lake and Minto City. They wanted to establish their own isolated camps rather than go to a government-administered internment camp. These camps operated on a communal basis where residents helped each other out. The communities grew crops or worked for neighbouring farmers or lumbermen to generate income. The total number of Japanese Canadians in these camps was around 1200 but was reduced to 1000 after some relocations. The British Columbia government would come to recognize these camps and appointed supervisors to look after the residents’ interests.

=== UBC students ===
In 1942, 76 students of Japanese descent studying at the University of British Columbia were told that they would not be able to continue their studies. Instead, they would be taken 100 miles inland to internment camps because of "war precautions". Given the trauma and disruption that this forced uprooting caused, 61 of these students would not be able to complete their education and 15 could not attend their graduation. 70 years later in 2012, UBC honoured these Japanese-Canadian students by including them in the university's Spring graduation programs and granting them honorary degrees.

== Demographics ==
Prior to 1896, no record was kept of the number of Japanese who arrived in British Columbia. At the turn of the century, there were 4,738 Japanese in Canada, of which 97% were in BC. In 2001, 44% of all Japanese Canadians lived in British Columbia, accounted for about 1% of the total population of the province. That year, 27,000 people of Japanese origin, or 32% of the total Japanese Canadian population, lived in Vancouver.

According to the 2016 Canadian Census, 36,990 people knew Japanese, 9,860 spoke Japanese at home, and 21,350 had Japanese as their mother tongue. Historically, Japanese-Canadians living in urban areas placed greater importance on learning Japanese than those living in rural areas.

== Notable places ==
=== Japantown, Vancouver ===
Japanese settlement in Canada centred around Powell Street starting in the 1880s and later became the economic hub of the Japanese Canadian community. Many of its residents worked at Hastings Mill, which became one of Canada's largest employers of Japanese immigrants. Social services in Japantown were provided by various Christian churches, offering English classes, daycare, and community amenities. By 1921, around 4000 Japanese residents lived in or within walking distance of Japantown. Powell Street and Cordova Street had 578 ethnic Japanese stores and organizations. In the 1930s, some Japanese Canadians moved outside of Japantown to other neighbourhoods such as Marpole. After the expulsion of Japanese Canadians from all areas within a 100-mile radius from the coast in 1942, the Japanese community on Powell Street disappeared and did not recover after the War.

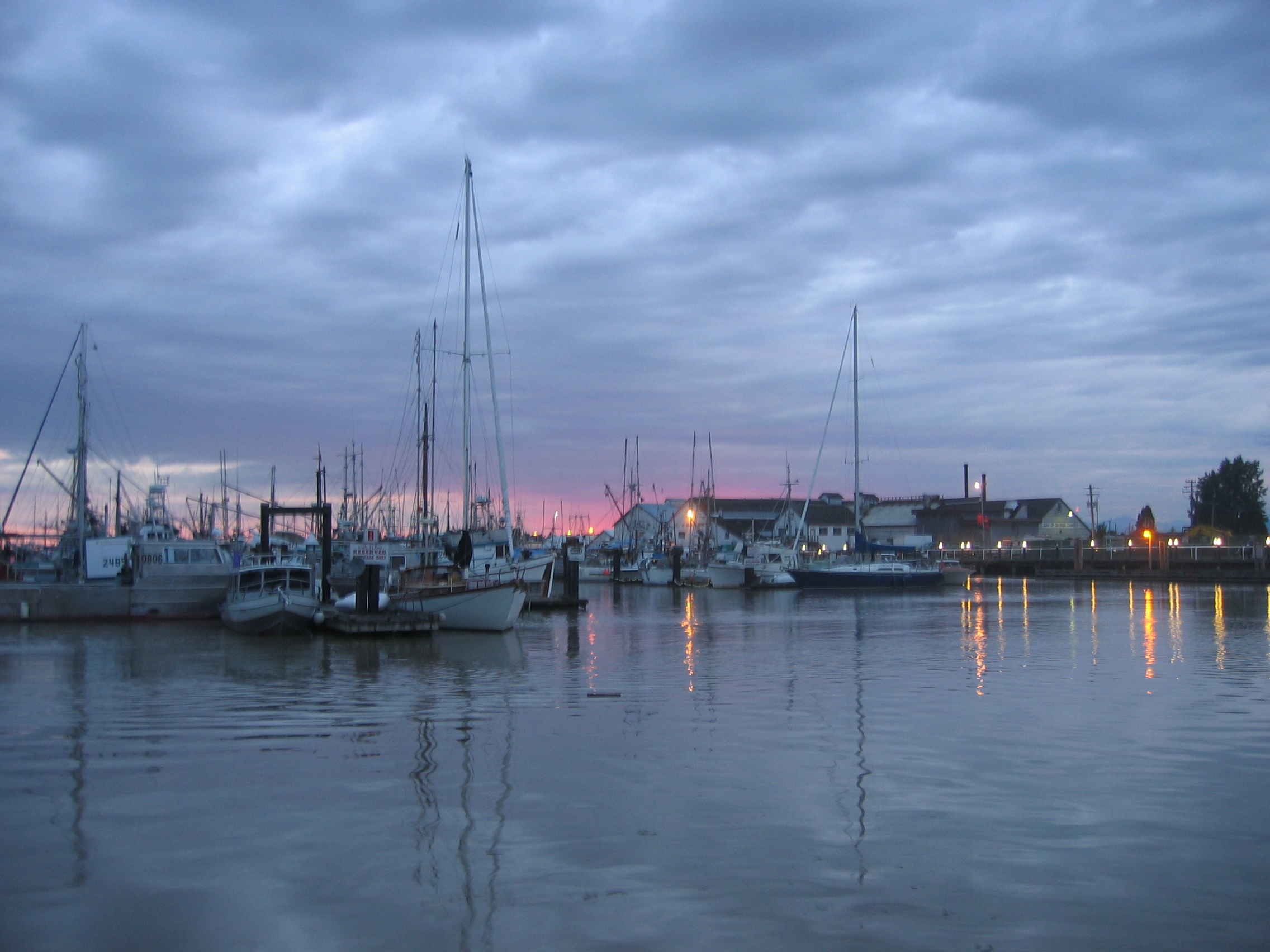
Steveston, British Columbia

=== Steveston, BC ===
In 1887, Gihei Kuno arrived at the Fraser River and discovered the potential of Steveston for fishing. Kuno invited his friends from the Mio district of Wakayama Prefecture to immigrate, resulting in heavy migration in the following years. As a result, Steveston became the second-largest Japanese-Canadian settlement after Vancouver before World War II. His recruitment also made Mio district the largest single source of Japanese emigrants to Canada. In 1900, the Japanese population of Steveston was estimated to be 4,500. A Japanese Methodist Mission hospital operated in Steveston from 1895 to 1942. Prior to the internment, Japanese Canadians made up more than half of Steveston's population. Today, there are several places of historical significance for the Japanese Community in Steveston, including the Steveston Japanese Language School, the Japanese Fishermen's Benevolent Society Building, and the Japanese Canadian Cultural Centre.

=== Woodfibre, BC ===
Woodfibre is a former town operating a pulp mill between early the 1900s and 2006. At one point, half of the population of Woodfibre was Japanese, and most were single men. In 1918, 59 were working in the mills; in 1920, 100; by 1930, the total number of Japanese employed was 230; but in 1934 it had decreased to 157. In 1940, the Japanese workers in Woodfibre were almost all employees of BC Pulp and Paper Company, numbered at 200.

=== Nikkei National Museum and Cultural Centre ===
Located in Burnaby, BC and opened on September 22, 2000, the Nikkei National Museum and Cultural Centre's mission is to honour, preserve and share the history and heritage of Japanese Canadians and Japanese culture in Canada. The museum contains 2600+ objects, 41,000+ photographs, 38 meters of textual records, 650 oral history recordings, and 156 film reels of historically and culturally significant items. The museum also organizes philanthropic programs to assist seniors and foster cultural and historical engagement in the local community.

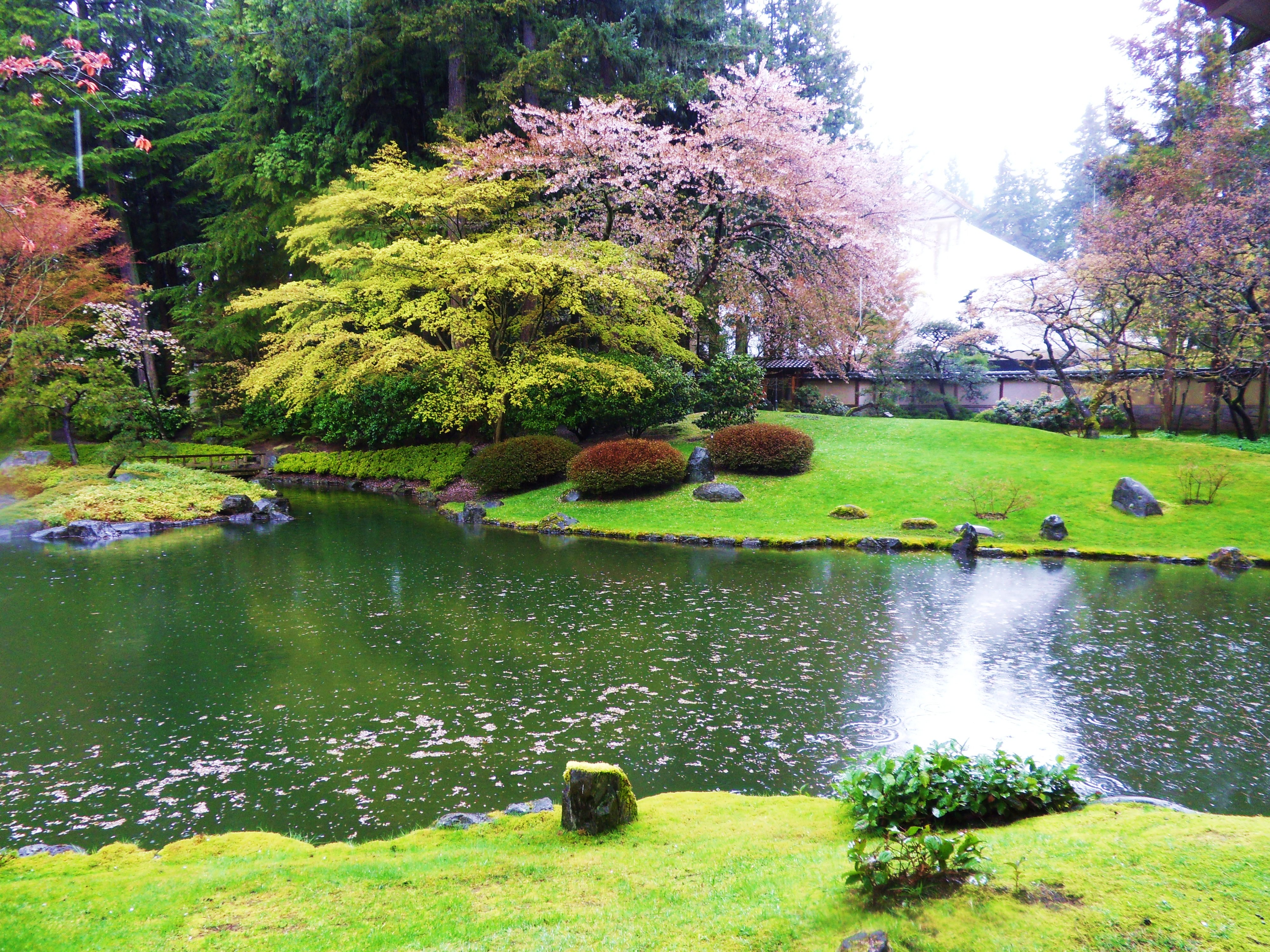
Nitobe Memorial Garden

=== Nitobe Memorial Garden ===
The Nitobe Memorial Garden is a traditional and authentic Japanese stroll garden and tea house located on the Vancouver campus of the University of British Columbia. The garden was created to celebrate the memory of Dr. Inazō Nitobe (1862–1933), a Japanese figure whose life goal was to promote a better understanding of Japan in the West at a period when there was little public knowledge of the country. Nitobe was a diplomat whose book, Bushido: The Soul of Japan was one of the first books on Japanese culture written for an international audience. The garden's faithful replication of its Japanese counterparts was affirmed when Emperor Akihito of Japan remarked, “I am in Japan”, as he walked through the garden.

=== Tashme ===
The Tashme Internment Camp was the largest and one of the most isolated Japanese internment camps constructed in 1942 by the Canadian government as part of its World War 2 policies. It is located 14 miles southeast of Hope, BC. The government did not provide any services to a population that reached 2644 and it was up to the interned Japanese to set up schools and community events. The camp was also a gathering site for Japanese-Canadians who were being sent back to Japan. The camp would be closed in 1946 but endures as a monument to the more than 22,000 people whose civil rights were suspended during the war.

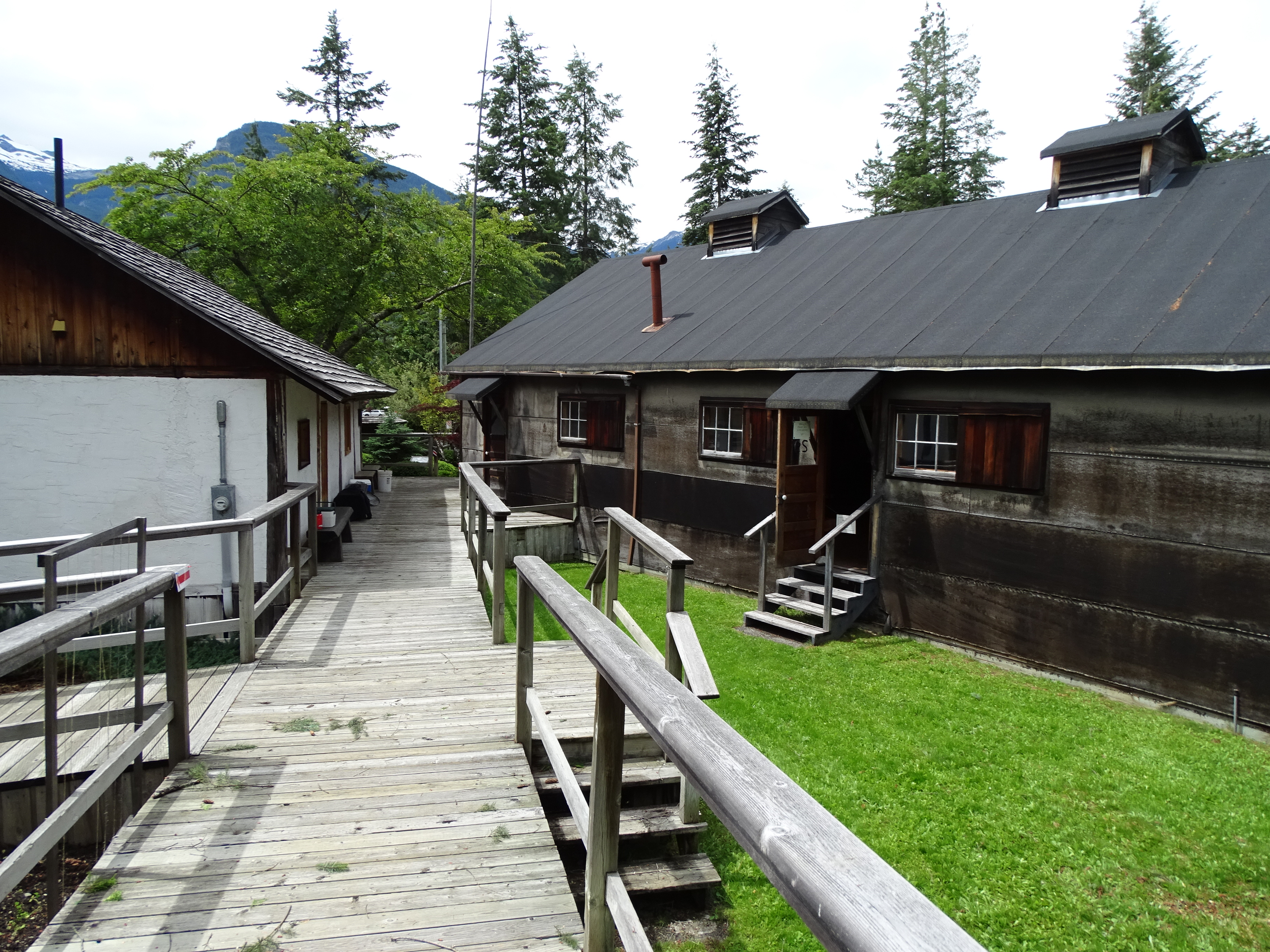
Historical buildings at the Nikkei Internment Memorial Centre

=== Nikkei Internment Memorial Centre ===
The Nikkei Internment Memorial Centre, located in New Denver, BC, is a national historic site of Canada designated in 2007. It was founded in 1992–94 to preserve historical buildings and commemorate the historical experiences of interned Japanese during World War 2. The site is located in “The Orchard”, one of the internment sites constructed by the Canadian government. The memorial centre is also one of the few sites that was not torn down and buildings from the internment period still exist today.

== Cultural impact ==
=== Vancouver Asahi ===
The Asahi baseball team was founded in 1914, playing out of the Powell Street Grounds (now Oppenheimer Park). Matsujiro Miyazaki, a Powell Street shop owner, was the team's first manager. The Vancouver Asahi was well known for its “brainball” strategy adapted for smaller players and with less hitting ability, based on stealing bases and bunts to get runners to home plate. The team disbanded in 1942 when its members were relocated to internment camps.

=== California roll ===
The California roll sushi has been claimed to be invented by local Vancouver Japanese chef, Hidekazu Tojo. Tojo was born in Southern Japan and after learning Japanese culinary in Osaka, moved to Vancouver in 1971 to open his restaurant, Tojo's. To cater to the differences in available ingredients and local preferences (many people then were reluctant to eat raw fish and seaweed) he developed the Tojo Roll, which is claimed to be the precursor to California Roll. The Tojo roll contains cooked crab meat and hides the seaweed in the inside of the roll, just like contemporary California rolls.

Today, the California roll is one of the most popular dishes to come from Japanese fusion cuisine and has played an instrumental role in the acceptance and eventual popularization of sushi (and Japanese cuisine and culture) in North America.

== Notable people ==
=== Academics ===
- Audrey Kobayashi, social scientist
- Santa J. Ono, biologist
- Irene Uchida, scientist and Down syndrome researcher

=== Activists ===
- Tomekichi Homma, voting rights activist
- Hide Hyodo Shimizu, educator and Japanese-Canadian civil rights activist

=== Architects ===
- Raymond Moriyama, architect

=== Athletes ===
- David Akutagawa, karateka
- Shane Higashi, karateka
- Nathan Hirayama, rugby player
- Kate Horne, curler
- Martin Kariya, ice hockey player
- Noriko Kariya, boxer
- Paul Kariya, ice hockey player
- Steve Kariya, ice hockey player
- Sarah Kawahara, figure skater
- Jason Krog, ice hockey player
- Glenn Michibata, tennis player
- Bryan Miki, curler
- Shigetaka Sasaki, judoka
- Raymond Sawada, ice hockey player
- Yoshio Senda, judoka
- Masaru Shintani, karateka
- Masao Takahashi, judoka and author
- Yuki Tsubota, freestyle skier

=== Film and broadcasting ===
- Jeff Chiba Stearns, documentarian and animator, One Big Hapa Family
- Brian Clement, filmmaker, Meat Market, Binge & Purge
- Severn Cullis-Suzuki, environmentalist, author and television host
- Kazumi Evans, actress and voice actress, My Little Pony: Friendship is Magic
- Robert Ito, actor, Quincy, M.E., Falcon Crest
- Hiro Kanagawa, actor, Smallville, The Man in the High Castle
- Byron Lawson, actor, Snakes on a Plane
- Margaret Lyons, former CBC vice president
- Tetsuro Shigematsu, filmmaker, playwright and radio broadcaster
- Dylan Akio Smith, film and video game director, Man. Feel. Pain., FIFA
- Jennifer Spence, actress, Stargate Universe, Continuum
- Peter Stursberg, writer and broadcaster
- David Suzuki, environmentalist and documentarian, The Nature of Things
- Lauren Toyota, television host
- Mia Uyeda, model and VJ
- Jai West, actor, Hazard, Big Bang Love, Juvenile A

=== Musicians ===
- Kenji Fusé, violinist
- Aristazabal Hawkes, double bassist, Guillemots
- Kytami, violinist
- Mark Takeshi McGregor, flutist
- Jon Kimura Parker, pianist
- Christine Yoshikawa, pianist

=== Politicians and government officials ===
- S. I. Hayakawa, former U.S. Senator for California
- Thomas Shoyama, economist and civil servant, early proponent and designer of Medicare
- Naomi Yamamoto, former MLA, for North Vancouver-Lonsdale, cabinet minister

=== Visual artists ===
- Roy Kiyooka, painter, photographer and multi-media artist
- Nobuo Kubota, multi-media artist
- Betty Mochizuki, painter and printmaker
- Cindy Mochizuki, multimedia artist
- Kazuo Nakamura, painter and sculptor
- Haruko Okano, mixed-media artist
- Tim Okamura, painter and graphic artist
- Takao Tanabe, painter

=== Writers and authors ===
- Ken Adachi, journalist
- Hiromi Goto, writer, The Kappa Child
- Joy Kogawa, author, Obasan
- Roy Miki, poet and scholar
- Kenzo Mori, journalist and newspaper publisher
- Ruth Ozeki, novelist, My Year of Meats, All Over Creation
- Aki Shimazaki, novelist and translator

=== Other ===
- Masumi Mitsui, World War I veteran
- Masajiro Miyazaki, physician
- Manzo Nagano, first recorded Japanese immigrant to Canada
- Gordon Goichi Nakayama, Anglican priest
- Hidekazu Tojo, chef, inventor of the B.C. roll

== See also ==
- Jodo Shinshu Buddhist Temples of Canada
- Asian Canadians
- Chinese Canadians in British Columbia
- Japanese Canadians
- Japanese in Toronto
- Demographics of British Columbia
- Japanese Americans
- East Asian Canadians
- Judo in Canada
- Reference re Persons of Japanese Race
- The Vancouver Asahi, 2014 Japanese film described Asahi (baseball team)
