= Japanese Canadians =

Ethnic group

日系カナダ人 Nikkei Kanadajin
- (Japan) (Canada)
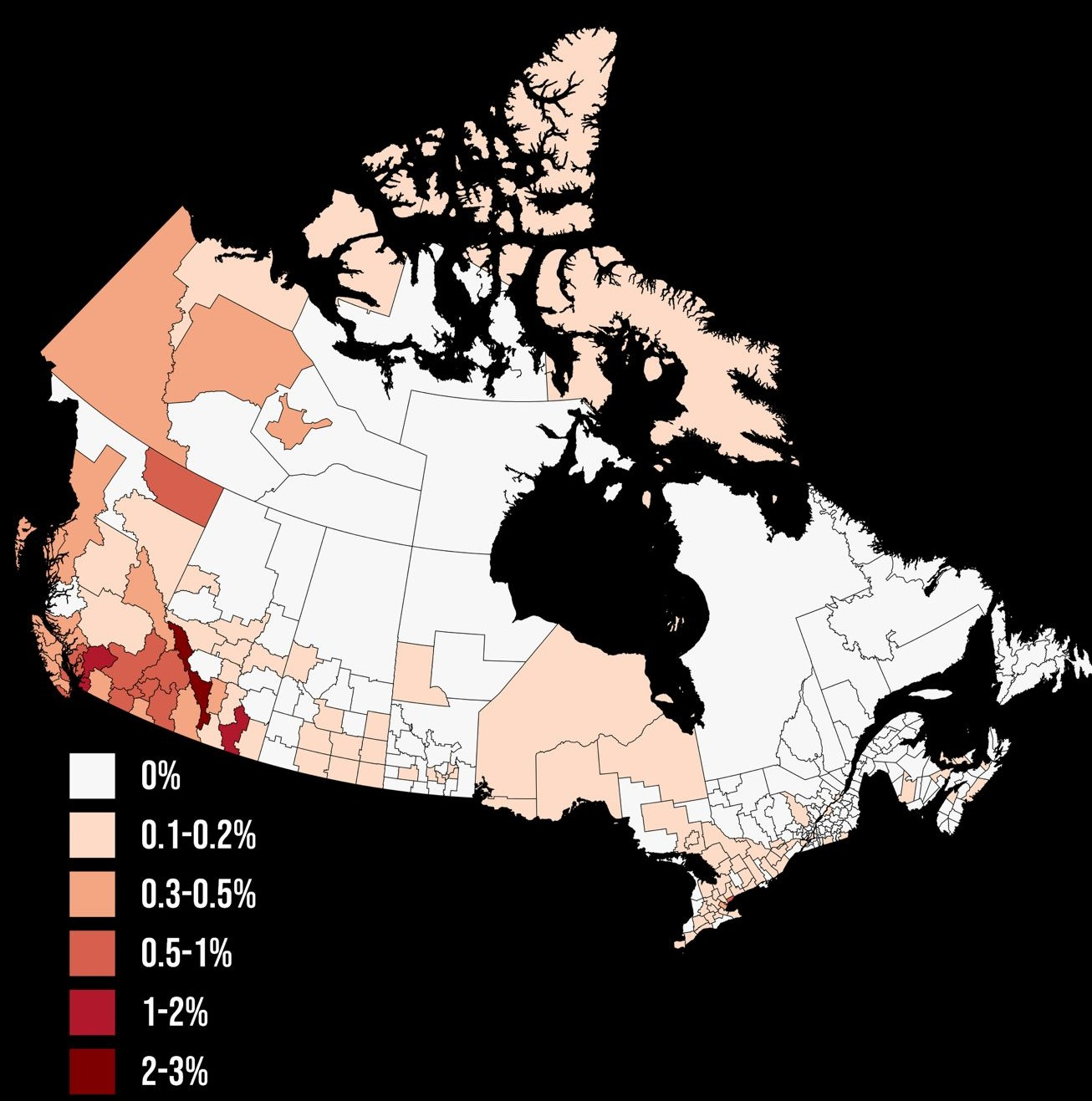
- Population distribution of Japanese Canadians by census division, 2021 census

Total population
- 129,425 (2021)

Regions with significant populations
- Vancouver, Burnaby, Richmond, Lethbridge, Edmonton

Languages
- English, French, and Japanese

Religion
- Irreligion (46%), Protestant (24%), Buddhism (16%), Catholic (9%), and other (5%)

Related ethnic groups
- Japanese, Japanese Americans, Japanese Brazilians, Japanese Peruvians, Japanese Mexicans

Japanese Canadians (日系カナダ人, Nikkei Kanadajin; French: Canadiens japonais) are Canadian citizens of Japanese ancestry. Japanese Canadians are mostly concentrated in Western Canada, especially in the province of British Columbia, which hosts the largest Japanese community in the country with the majority of them living in and around Vancouver. In 2021, there were 129,425 Japanese Canadians throughout Canada.

== Generations ==
The term Nikkei (日系) was coined by sociologists and encompasses all of the world's Japanese immigrants across generations. Japanese descendants living overseas have special names for each of their generations. These are formed by combining one of the Japanese numerals with the Japanese word for generation (sei, 世):

- Issei (一世) – The first generation of immigrants, born in Japan before moving to Canada.
- Nisei (二世) – The second generation, born in Canada to Issei parents not born in Canada.
- Sansei (三世) – The third generation, born in Canada to Nisei parents born in Canada.
- Yonsei (四世) – The fourth generation, born in Canada to Sansei parents born in Canada.
- Gosei (五世) – The fifth generation, born in Canada to Yonsei parents born in Canada.

== History ==
=== Early years ===
The first Japanese settler in Canada was Manzo Nagano, who lived in Victoria, British Columbia in 1877 (a mountain in the province was named after him in 1977). The first generation or Issei, mostly came to Vancouver Island, the Fraser Valley and Rivers Inlet from fishing villages on the islands of Kyūshū and Honshū between 1877 and 1928. A Japanese community newspaper for Vancouver residents was first launched in 1897. Around the same time, the Fraser River Japanese Fishermen's Association Hospital in Steveston was established after the local hospital refused to admit and treat Japanese immigrants.

In 1907, the Asiatic Exclusion League was established in Vancouver and, by September of that year, led a mob of rioters who vandalized both Chinese and Japanese neighbourhoods. In 1908, Canada and Japan signed a Gentlemen's Agreement intended to curb further Japanese immigration to Canada.

Influenced by the American Immigration Act of 1924, members of the British Columbia parliament pushed for a total federal ban on immigration in the 1920s. After several years of negotiations, Japan eventually agreed to reduce its immigration quota under the Gentleman's Agreement to only 150 persons per year.

=== Internment ===
On January 14, 1942, the Canadian government used the War Measures Act to brand Japanese-Canadians enemy aliens and to categorize them as security threats. There were 20,881 Japanese placed in internment camps and road camps in British Columbia, and prisoner-of-war camps in Ontario. Families were also sent as forced labourers to farms throughout the prairies. Three quarters of them were already citizens in Canada. A marginally similar situation occurred in the United States, the Japanese American internment.

The property and homes of Japanese Canadians living in the province of British Columbia were seized and sold off without their consent in 1943. The funds were used to pay for their internment. They also had to "pay rent" for living in the internment shacks that they were assigned. In 1945, after the war, as part of the continued effort to remove all Japanese Canadians from British Columbia, Prime Minister William Lyon MacKenzie King had his cabinet pass Orders-in-Council to extend the powers of the War Measures Act and give Japanese Canadians two "options": to be relocated to another province "East of the Rockies" or to go "back" to Japan though most were born in Canada and had never been to Japan. After organized protests by against their treatment, they were finally given the right to vote in 1949. Mobility restrictions were lifted in 1949.

=== After World War II ===
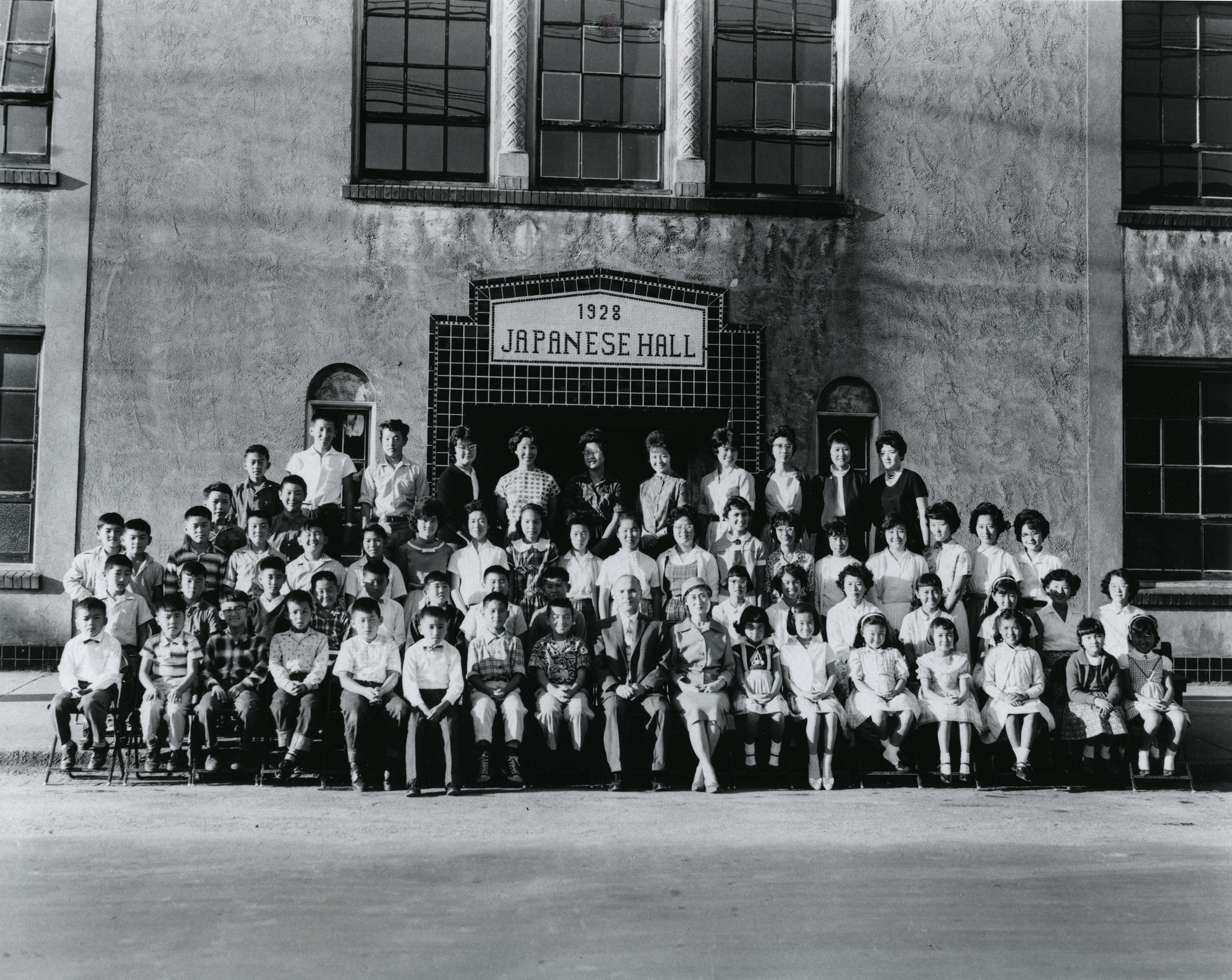
Japanese Canadians gather at the Vancouver Japanese Language School and Japanese Hall.

Until 1948, Japanese-Canadians, both Issei and Canadian-born Nisei, were denied the right to vote. Those born in the 1950s and 1960s in Canada are mostly Sansei, the third generation. Sansei usually have little knowledge of the Japanese language. Over 75% of the Sansei have married non-Japanese. Nisei and Sansei generally identify themselves not as fully Japanese but as Canadians first who happen to have Japanese ancestry.

Since 1967, the second wave of immigrants were usually highly educated and resided in urban areas.

In the late 1970s and the 1980s, documents on the Japanese Canadian internment were released, and redress was sought by the National Association of Japanese Canadians, an organization representing Japanese Canadians nationally that was headed by Art Miki from Winnipeg. In 1986, it was shown that Japanese Canadians had lost $443 million during the internment. There were 63% of Canadians who supported redress and 45% who favoured individual compensation. On September 22, 1988, the National Association of Japanese Canadians succeeded in negotiating a redress settlement with the government at the time, under the leadership of Prime Minister Brian Mulroney. The settlement included $21,000 for each individual directly affected, which was by 1993 almost 18,000 survivors. The federal government also provided a community endowment fund to assist in rebuilding the community, which is run by the National Association of Japanese Canadians. In addition, to address the more systemic racism that led to the plan and later justifications of the effort to remove "all people of Japanese racial origin" from Canadian territory, the redress settlement included the establishment of the Race Relations Foundation and challenges to the War Measures Act. The Prime Minister also offered a formal apology in the House of Commons and the certificate of acknowledgement of injustices of the past, which was sent to each Japanese Canadian whose rights had been stripped, incarcerated, dispossessed and forcibly displaced.

The younger generation of Japanese-Canadians born in the late 20th century are mostly Yonsei, the fourth generation. Many Yonsei are of mixed racial descent. According to Statistics Canada's 2001 census of population information, Japanese-Canadians were the Canadian visible minority group most likely to have a formal or common-law marriage with a non-Japanese partner. Out of the 25,100 couples in Canada in 2001 that had at least one Japanese person, in only 30% of them were both partners of Japanese descent. As of 2001, 65% of Canada's Japanese population was born in Canada.

== Education ==
Locations of hoshū jugyō kō in Canada

Hoshū jugyō kō (Japanese supplementary schools) for instruction of the Japanese language include those in Calgary, Edmonton, Halifax, London, Montreal, Ottawa, Saskatoon, Toronto, and Vancouver.

With teachers from Japan:

- Toronto Japanese School
- Vancouver Japanese School (バンクーバー補習授業校, Bankūbā Hoshū Jugyō Kō) - Established on April 7, 1973 (Showa Year 48).

Without teachers from Japan:

- Alberta
  - Calgary Hoshuko Japanese School Association (カルガリー補習授業校 Karugarī Hoshū Jugyō Kō)
  - Metro Edmonton Japanese Community School (MEJCS; エドモントン補習校 Edomonton Hoshūkō)
- Nova Scotia
  - Japanese School of Halifax (ハリファックス補習授業校 Harifakkusu Hoshū Jugyō Kō)
- Ontario
  - London (CA) Japanese School (ロンドン（CA）補習授業校 Rondon Hoshū Jugyō Kō)
  - The Ottawa Hoshuko (オタワ補習校 Otawa Hoshūkō)
- Quebec
  - Montreal Hoshuko School
- Saskatchewan
  - Saskatoon Japanese Language School (サスカトーン補習授業校 Sasukatōn Hoshū Jugyō Kō)

== Demographics ==
Historical population
Year	Pop.	±%
1901	4,738	—
1911	9,067	+91.4%
1921	15,868	+75.0%
1931	23,342	+47.1%
1941	23,149	−0.8%
1951	21,663	−6.4%
1961	29,157	+34.6%
1971	37,260	+27.8%
1981	40,995	+10.0%
1986	54,505	+33.0%
1991	65,680	+20.5%
1996	77,130	+17.4%
2001	85,225	+10.5%
2006	98,905	+16.1%
2011	109,740	+11.0%
2016	121,485	+10.7%
2021	129,425	+6.5%

=== Japanese Canadians by province or territory ===
Japanese Canadian population by province and territory in Canada in 2021 according to Statistics Canada:

Province or territory	Japanese Canadians	Percentage
Canada	129,425	0.4%
British Columbia	54,640	1.1%
Ontario	42,250	0.3%
Alberta	18,605	0.4%
Quebec	7,460	0.1%
Manitoba	2,770	0.2%
Saskatchewan	1,295	0.1%
Nova Scotia	1,125	0.1%
New Brunswick	440	0.1%
Yukon	275	0.7%
Prince Edward Island	250	0.2%
Newfoundland and Labrador	150	0.0%
Northwest Territories	145	0.4%
Nunavut	15	0.0%

== Gallery ==
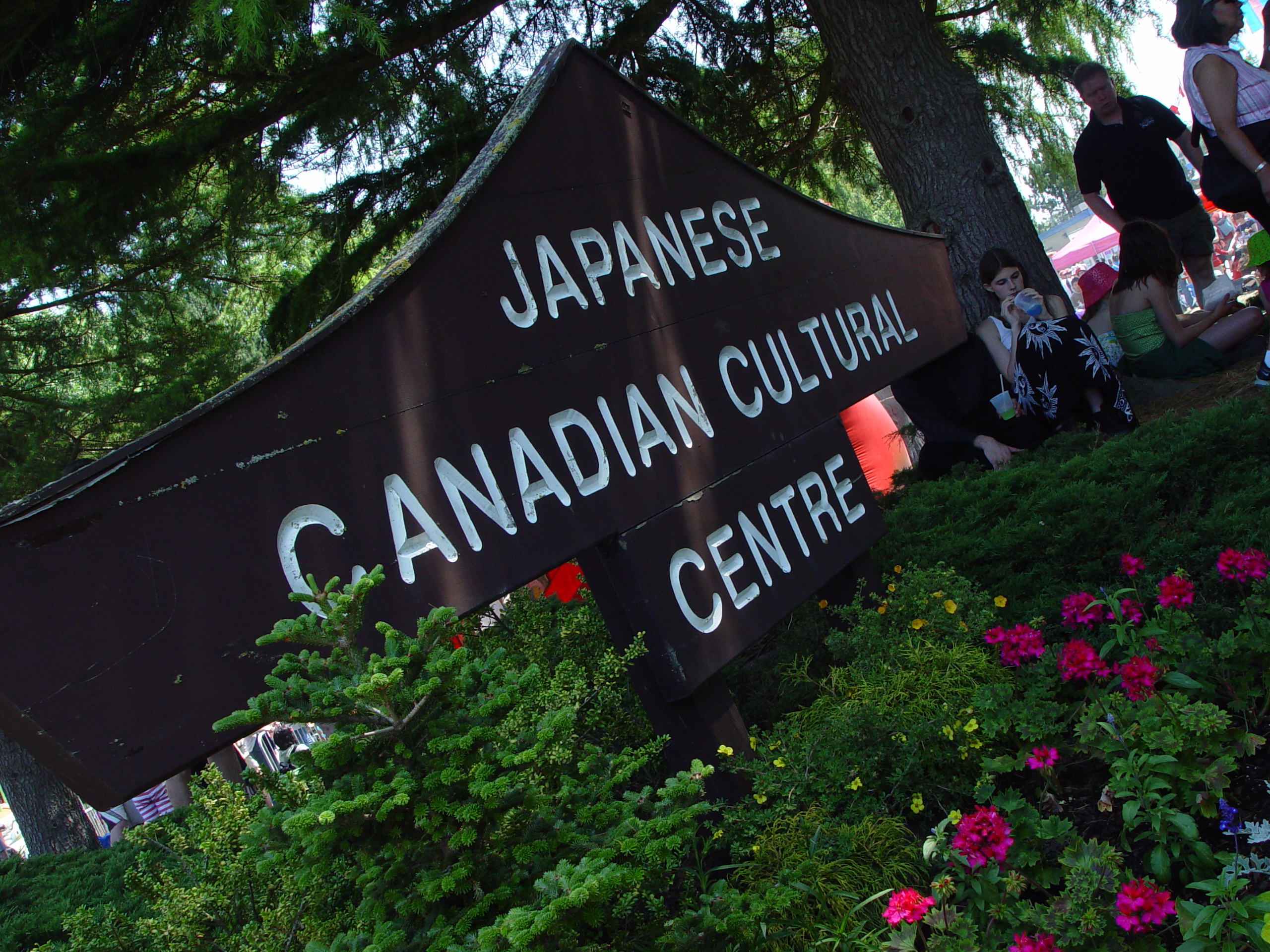
Japanese Canadian Cultural Centre in Steveston, Richmond, BC

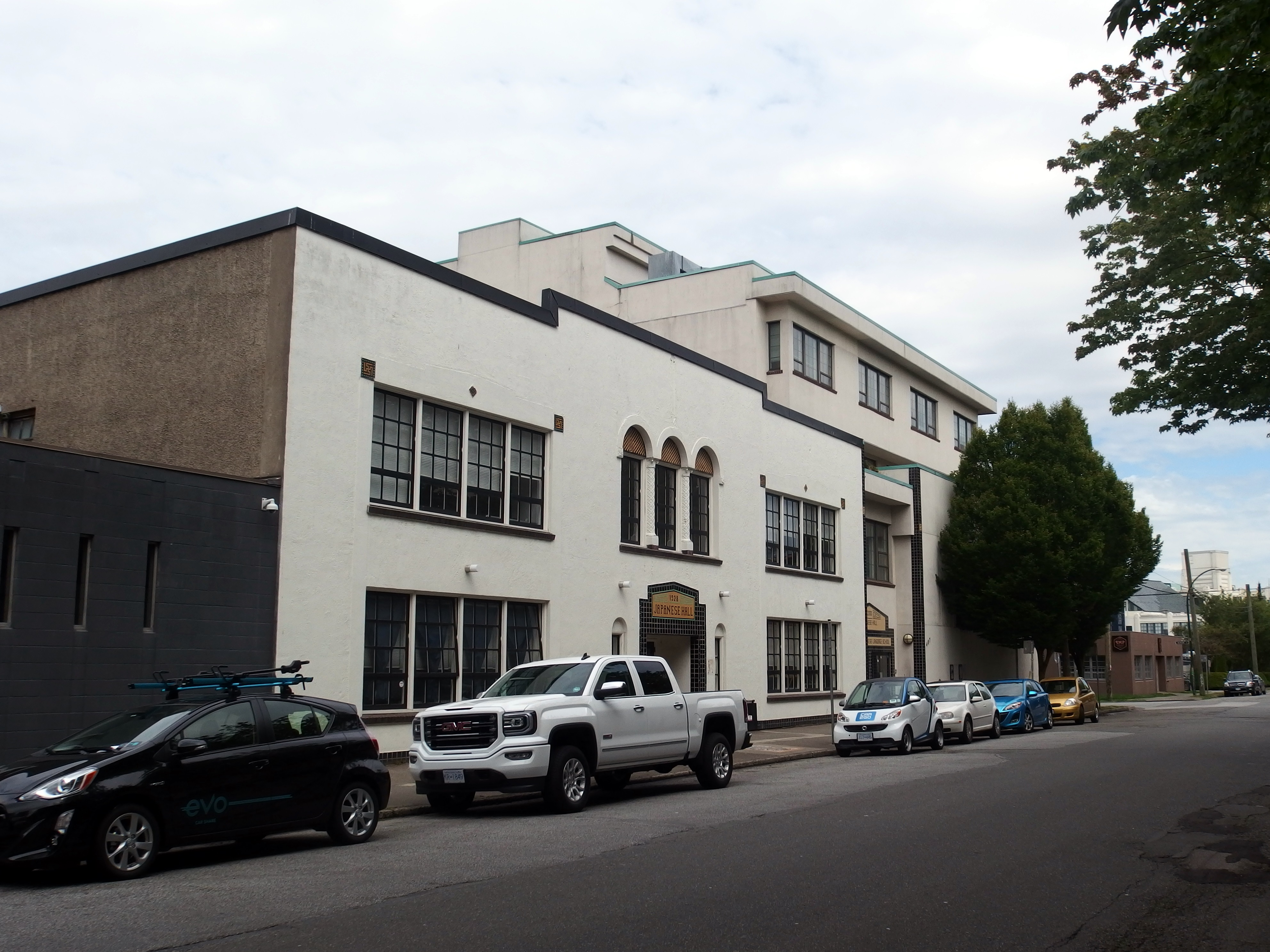
Vancouver Japanese Language School in Vancouver, BC is the oldest Japanese language school in Canada.

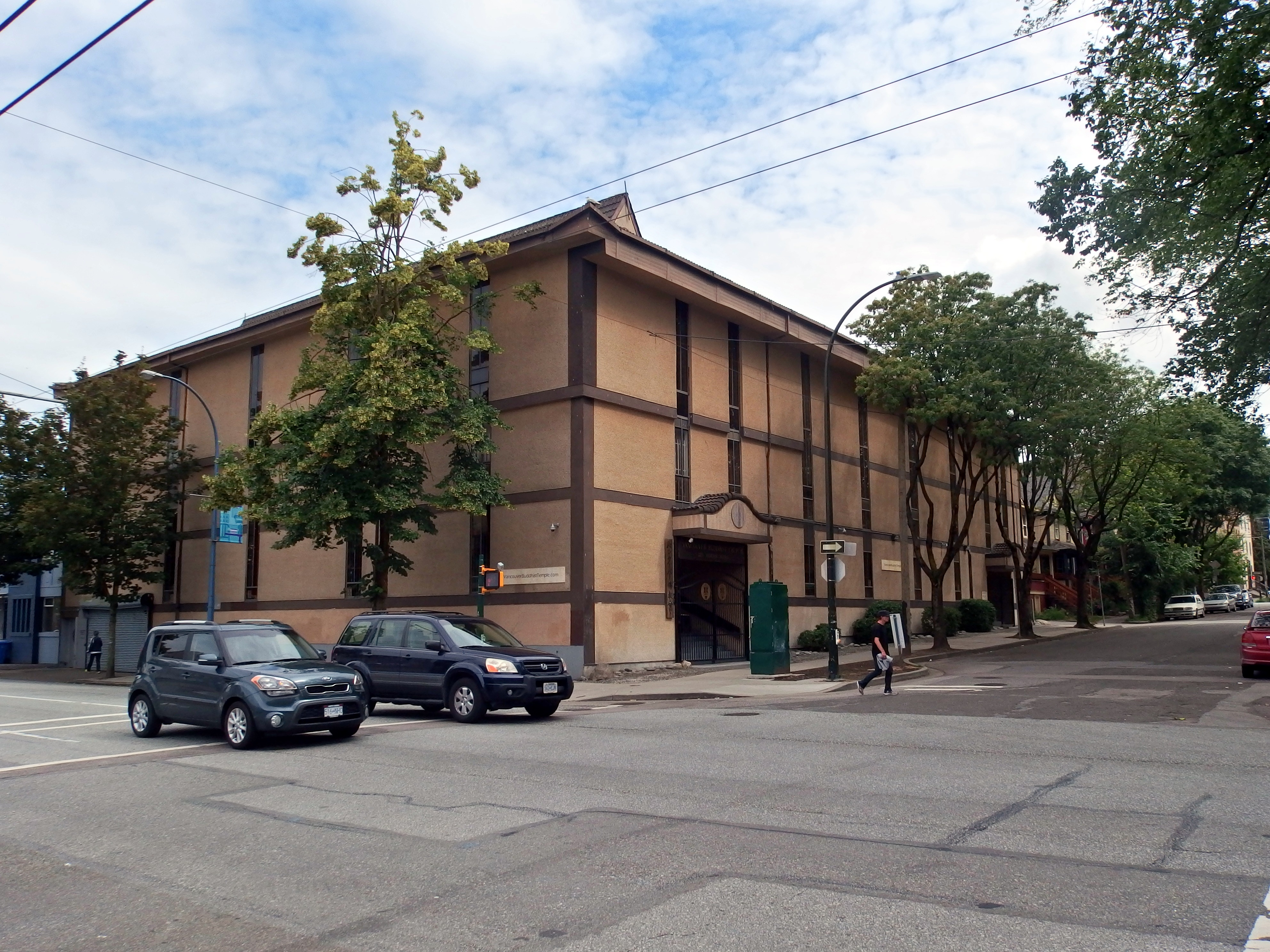
Vancouver Buddhist Temple in Vancouver, BC

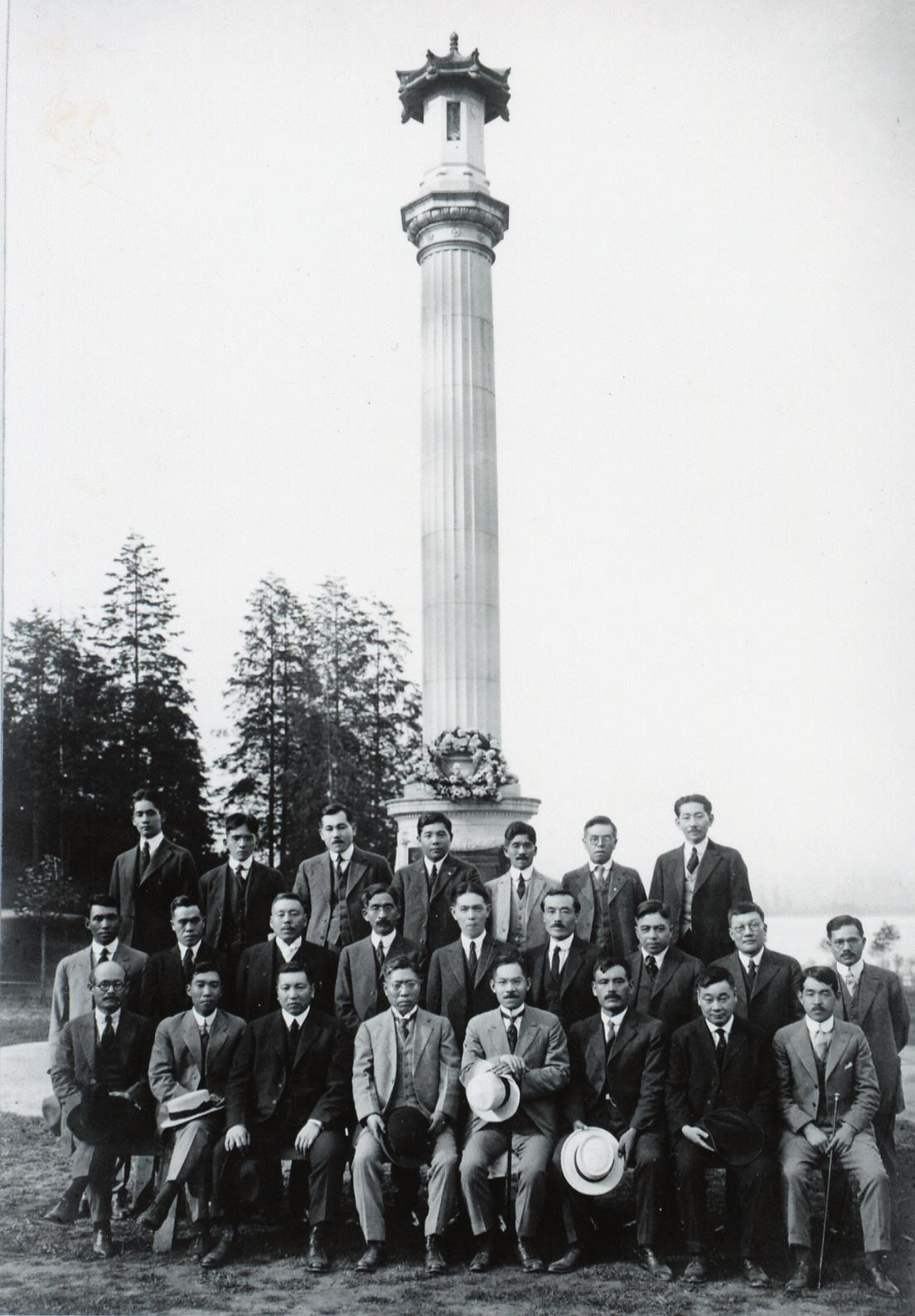
Founding members of the Canadian Japanese Association at the Japanese Canadian War Memorial in Stanley Park, Vancouver, BC

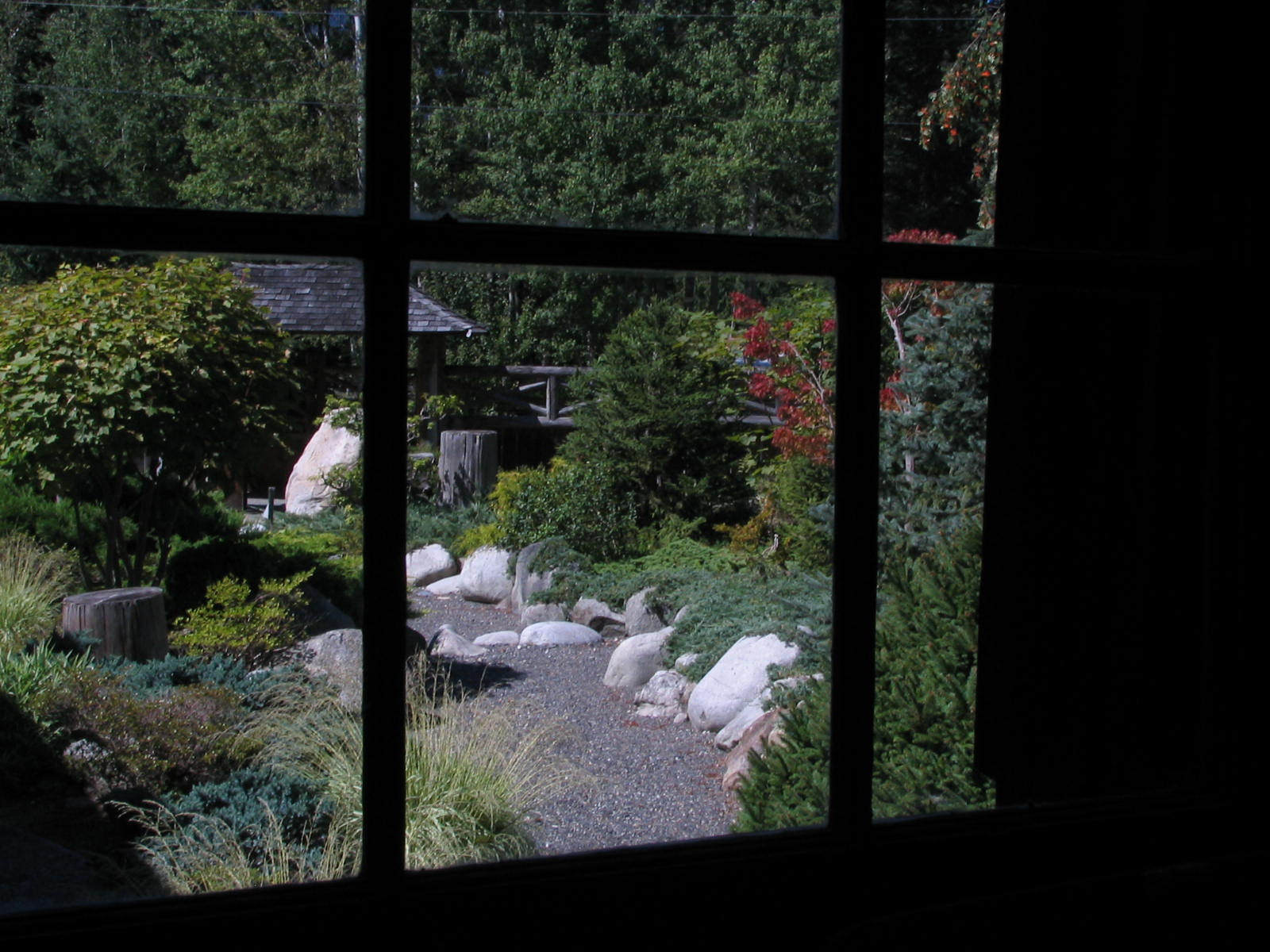
Nikkei Internment Memorial Centre in New Denver, BC is designated as a National Historic Site of Canada.

== Notable people ==
=== Academics ===
- Audrey Kobayashi, social scientist
- Yoshio Masui, cell biologist
- Roy Miki, poet
- Emi Nakamura, economist
- Santa J. Ono, biologist
- Irene Uchida, scientist and Down syndrome researcher
- Noriko Yui, mathematician

=== Activists ===
- Tomekichi Homma, voting rights activist
- Art Miki, activist
- Hide Hyodo Shimizu, educator and Japanese-Canadian civil rights activist
- Setsuko Thurlow, anti-nuclear and peace activist

=== Architects ===
- Bruce Kuwabara, architect
- Raymond Moriyama, architect

=== Athletes ===
- David Akutagawa, karateka
- Noah Kenshin Browne, soccer player
- Yuka Chokyu, para-badminton player
- Christa Deguchi, judoka
- Bill Hatanaka, football player
- Shane Higashi, karateka
- Nathan Hirayama, rugby player
- Akito Hirose, ice hockey player
- Taro Hirose, ice hockey player
- Kate Horne, curler
- Martin Kariya, ice hockey player
- Noriko Kariya, boxer
- Paul Kariya, ice hockey player
- Steve Kariya, ice hockey player
- Yoshio Katsuta, judoka
- Sarah Kawahara, figure skater
- Jason Krog, ice hockey player
- Jon Matsumoto, ice hockey player
- Glenn Michibata, tennis player
- Bryan Miki, curler
- Keegan Messing, figure skater
- Issey Nakajima-Farran, soccer player
- Paris Nakajima-Farran, soccer player
- Emily Nishikawa, cross-country skier
- Kristy Odamura, softball player
- Takemasa Okuyama, karateka
- Stuart Percy, ice hockey player
- Shigetaka Sasaki, judoka
- Raymond Sawada, ice hockey player
- Yoshio Senda, judoka
- Devin Setoguchi, ice hockey player
- Masaru Shintani, karateka
- Jamie Storr, ice hockey player
- Vicky Sunohara, ice hockey player and coach
- Nick Suzuki, ice hockey player
- Ryan Suzuki, ice hockey player
- Masao Takahashi, judoka and author
- Phil Takahashi, judoka
- Ray Takahashi, wrestler and judoka
- Tina Takahashi, judoka
- Atsuko Tanaka, ski jumper
- Yuki Tsubota, freestyle skier
- Masami Tsuruoka, karateka
- Katie Tsuyuki, snowboarder
- John Tucker, ice hockey player
- Nyl Yakura, badminton player
- Joe Yamauchi, footballer
- Kimiko Zakreski, snowboarder

=== Film and broadcasting ===
- Mio Adilman, actor, TV host and writer, Trailer Park Boys, The Strain
- Nobu Adilman, actor, TV host and writer Trailer Park Boys, Food Jammers
- Denis Akiyama, actor and voice actor, Johnny Mnemonic, Sailor Moon
- Jeff Chiba Stearns, documentarian and animator, One Big Hapa Family
- Brian Clement, filmmaker, Meat Market, Binge & Purge
- Severn Cullis-Suzuki, environmentalist, author and television host
- Kazumi Evans, actress and voice actress, My Little Pony: Friendship is Magic
- Jeananne Goossen, actress, Falcon Beach, Criminal Minds
- Mary Ito, radio and television host
- Robert Ito, actor, Quincy, M.E., Falcon Crest
- Brenda Kamino, actress, Carter
- Hiro Kanagawa, actor, Smallville, The Man in the High Castle
- Andrew Kishino, voice actor and rapper, The LeBrons, Fortnite
- Byron Lawson, actor, Snakes on a Plane
- Margaret Lyons, former CBC vice president
- Nobu McCarthy, actress, The Wash
- Philip Nozuka, actor, Degrassi: The Next Generation
- Linda Ohama, documentary filmmaker
- Randall Okita, screenwriter and filmmaker, The Lockpicker
- Lauren Riihimaki, YouTuber
- Tetsuro Shigematsu, filmmaker, playwright and radio broadcaster
- Peter Shinkoda, actor, Falling Skies, Daredevil
- Dylan Akio Smith, film and video game director, Man. Feel. Pain., FIFA
- Jennifer Spence, actress, Stargate Universe, Continuum
- Peter Stursberg, writer and broadcaster
- Richard Stursberg, former CBC executive vice president
- David Suzuki, environmentalist and documentarian, The Nature of Things
- Mutsumi Takahashi, television news anchor
- Lauren Toyota, television host
- Mia Uyeda, model and VJ
- Jai West, actor, Hazard, Big Bang Love, Juvenile A
- Lisa Yamanaka, actress and voice actress, The Magic School Bus
- Mayumi Yoshida, actress and filmmaker (Akashi)

=== Musicians ===
- David Genn, song writer and guitarist of 54-40 and former guitarist to Matthew Good Band
- Kenji Fusé, violinist
- Saya Gray, alternative pop bassist
- Aristazabal Hawkes, double bassist, Guillemots
- Ron Korb, flautist
- Kytami, violinist
- Catherine Manoukian, violinist
- Mark Takeshi McGregor, flutist
- George Nozuka, R&B singer
- Justin Nozuka, singer-songwriter
- Jon Kimura Parker, pianist
- Alcvin Ramos, shakuhachi player
- Tim Tamashiro, jazz singer and radio broadcaster
- Diyet van Lieshout, folk singer
- Jonah Yano, indie pop singer-songwriter
- Christine Yoshikawa, pianist

=== Politicians and government officials ===
- S. I. Hayakawa, former U.S. Senator for California
- Rob Miyashiro, MLA for Lethbridge-West
- Bev Oda, former MP for Durham, cabinet minister
- Thomas Shoyama, economist and civil servant, early proponent and designer of Medicare
- David Tsubouchi, former MPP for Markham, cabinet minister
- Naomi Yamamoto, former MLA, for North Vancouver-Lonsdale, cabinet minister
- Tany Yao, MLA for Fort McMurray-Wood Buffalo

=== Visual artists ===
- Roy Kiyooka, painter, photographer and multi-media artist
- Nobuo Kubota, multi-media artist
- Nina Matsumoto, comic book artist, Saturnalia
- Takeshi Miyazawa, comic book artist, Mary Jane, Runaways
- Betty Mochizuki, painter and printmaker
- Cindy Mochizuki, multimedia artist
- Tomori Nagamoto, visual artist and poet
- Kazuo Nakamura, painter and sculptor
- Matsubara Naoko, printmaker and painter
- Emma Nishimura, printmaker, photographer and sculptor
- Haruko Okano, mixed-media artist
- Tim Okamura, painter and graphic artist
- Midi Onodera, video artist
- Marjorie Pigott, painter
- Jillian Tamaki, comic book artist, This One Summer
- Miyuki Tanobe, painter
- Takao Tanabe, painter

=== Writers and authors ===
- Ken Adachi, journalist
- Hiromi Goto, writer, The Kappa Child
- Tamai Kobayashi, novelist and short story writer
- Joy Kogawa, author, Obasan
- Kyo Maclear, novelist and children's author
- Roy Miki, poet and scholar
- Kenzo Mori, journalist and newspaper publisher
- Kim Moritsugu, novelist
- Sachiko Murakami, poet
- Norimitsu Onishi, journalist
- Ruth Ozeki, novelist, My Year of Meats, All Over Creation
- Michelle Sagara, novelist
- Kerri Sakamoto, novelist and screenwriter, Strawberry Fields
- Mark Sakamoto, writer and lawyer
- Aki Shimazaki, novelist and translator
- Mariko Tamaki, graphic novelist, This One Summer, She-Hulk
- Grace Eiko Thomson, curator and memoirist

=== Other ===
- Dan Liu, fashion designer
- Masumi Mitsui, World War I veteran
- Masajiro Miyazaki, physician
- Manzo Nagano, first recorded Japanese immigrant to Canada
- Gordon Goichi Nakayama, Anglican priest
- Kyedae, online streamer
- Rick Shiomi, playwright and director, Yellow Fever
- Hidekazu Tojo, chef, inventor of the B.C. roll
- Bob Izumi, Angler

== See also ==
- Canada–Japan relations
- Asian Canadians
- Japanese Canadians in British Columbia
- Japanese in Toronto
- Japanese in Montreal
- Canadians in Japan
- Japanese Americans
- East Asian Canadians
- Judo in Canada
- Jodo Shinshu Buddhist Temples of Canada
- Reference re Persons of Japanese Race
- The Vancouver Asahi, 2014 Japanese film described Asahi (baseball team)
