= Margaret Lyons =

Canadian public broadcasting executive (1923–2019)

Margaret Lyons CM
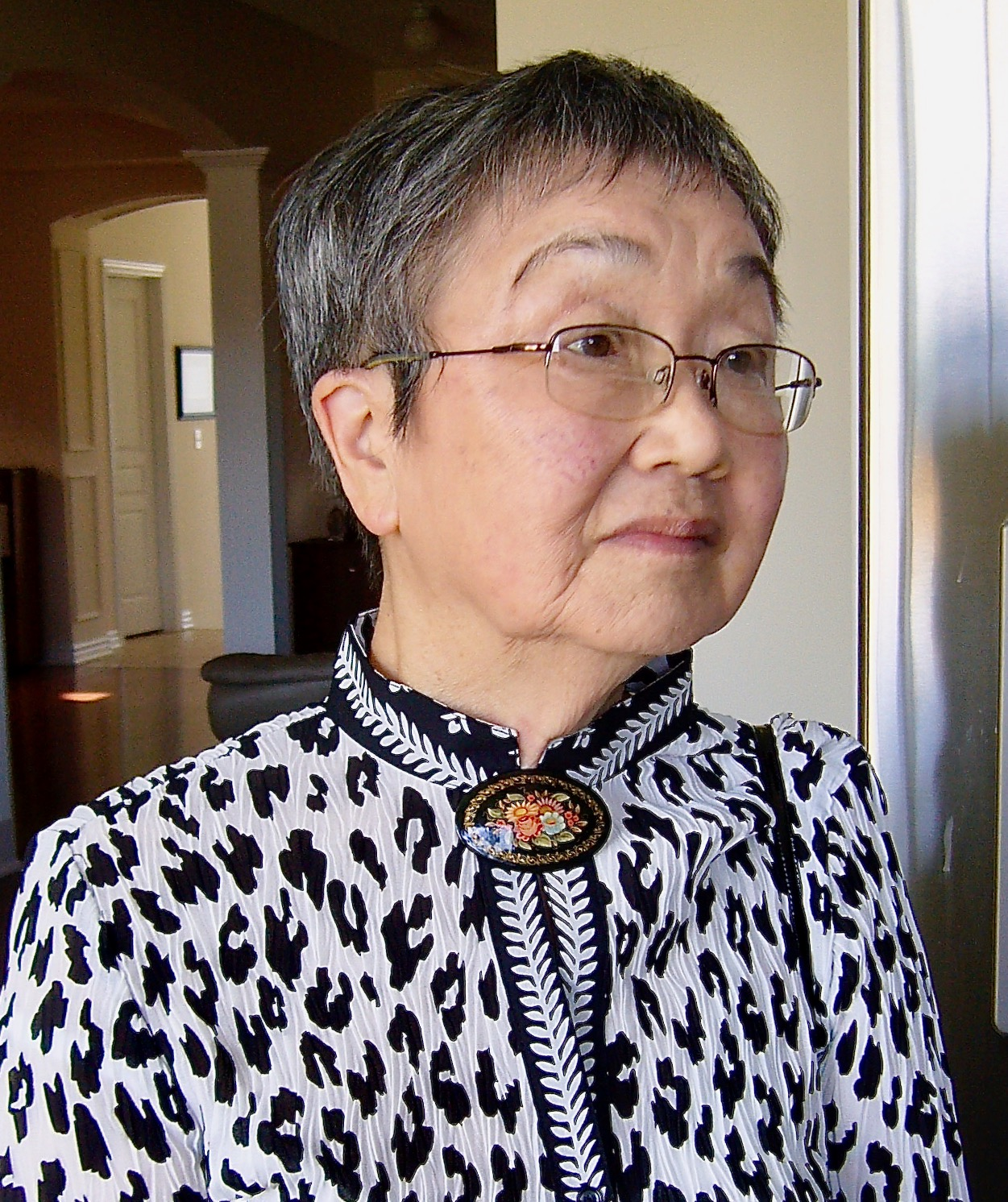
- Born: November 21, 1923; Mission, British Columbia, Canada
- Died: October 4, 2019 (aged 95); Toronto, Ontario, Canada
- Other name: Keiko Margaret Inouye
- Education: McMaster University
- Occupation: Radio executive
- Awards: Order of Canada

Keiko Margaret Lyons CM (née Inouye; November 21, 1923 – October 4, 2019) was the first female vice president of the Canadian Broadcasting Corporation (CBC). She is known for her role in the CBC's "Radio Revolution", a populist revamp of the CBC Radio network which resulted in programs such as Quirks and Quarks and As It Happens. Lyons was designated a Member of the Order of Canada in 2010 for her work in broadcasting.

== Early life and education ==
Lyons was born Keiko Margaret Inouye on November 21, 1923, in Mission, British Columbia, to Japanese immigrants Yoshinobu Inouye and Teru Tsuji. In 1942, Lyons and her family were forced to leave Mission due to a mass expulsion of Japanese-Canadians from the area. The family settled in Winnipeg, Manitoba, where Lyons did domestic work. In 1944, Lyons moved to Hamilton, Ontario, and worked as a maid at McMaster University while completing her high school diploma. She then attended the university and earned a degree in economics. After graduation, she married fellow student Ed Lyons and relocated to London, England.

== Career ==
Lyons began working as a typist for the British Broadcasting Corporation (BBC) in 1952. A year and a half later, she became a producer for BBC's Asian current affairs service, where she worked for six years. In 1957, Lyons interviewed Lester Pearson following his receipt of the Nobel Peace Prize, and he encouraged her to enter the Canadian journalism industry. Accordingly, Lyons moved to Toronto in 1960 and became a public affairs producer for CBC Radio. She was soon promoted to supervisor. Lyons headed CBC Radio's current affairs department and directed the AM radio service before being promoted to vice president of network radio in 1983, becoming the first woman vice president at the CBC. Within the CBC, Lyons held a reputation of "benevolent ferocity" and was affectionately referred to as the "Dragon Lady".

During the early 1970s, Lyons was tasked with revitalizing CBC's struggling radio service, which, according to Barbara Frum, had become "ponderous, a sort of university of the air ... it talked down to people and was patronizingly intellectual". Aiming to create a more informal and entertaining atmosphere, Lyons hired several young producers and hosts, including Frum, Mark Starowicz and Peter Gzowski. Lyons incorporated pop and rock and roll music into her programs and eliminated lengthy documentaries. Under her leadership, CBC produced influential programs like Quirks and Quarks, As It Happens and Morningside. This populist reimagining of CBC Radio was termed the "Radio Revolution".

Lyons's changes were met with controversy: producer Val Clery complained that Lyons prioritized marketing over content, and newspaper critics accused Lyons of pandering to yuppies and turning the CBC into the "Burger Queen of public broadcasting". Supporters called Lyons "formidably brilliant" and commended her for saving CBC Radio from a "suicidal" trajectory. Lyons was remembered by CBC executive Peter Herrndorf as "arguably the most important and the most influential CBC radio executive in the past 60 years" and one of the network's greatest talent developers.

In 1986, Lyons moved back to London, where she worked as Director of European Operations for the CBC. Lyons retired from the CBC in 1991 and returned to Toronto.

Lyons was awarded an honorary Doctorate of Letters by McMaster University in 1996. The university's Lyons New Media Center is named for her. In 2010, Lyons was made a Member of the Order of Canada for her achievements in broadcasting.

== Personal life and death ==
Lyons (née Inouye) married Ed Lyons in 1949. She had two children, a son and a daughter. Lyons served on the McMaster University Senate for six years and volunteered for local historical preservation societies and Japanese cultural organizations.

Lyons underwent medically assisted death in Toronto on October 4, 2019.
