= Kenzo Mori =

Kenzo Mori (Japanese: 森研三, 1914 – January 5, 2007) was a Nisei Japanese-Canadian journalist, writer, editor and publisher of the New Canadian, an English-language newspaper aimed at second- and third-generation Japanese Canadians.

== Early life ==
Mori was born near Vancouver, British Columbia, in 1914. He was the son of immigrants who returned to Japan in 1918. He left Japan at age 16, graduating from high school in Canada. In due course, he earned an arts degree from the University of British Columbia.

=== Internment ===
Mori was interned in a camp north of Vancouver during the Second World War. His older brother, George, was also in the camp along with his nephew Ricki Mori.

== Career ==
Mori became the assistant Japanese editor of The New Canadian in the late 1940s. When retired in 1983, he had become the newspaper's editor. Mori was a founding member of the Ontario and Canadian Ethnic Press Associations.

In the pages of the newspaper and elsewhere, Mori tried to be a constructive voice in the movement to address the material losses and humiliation Japanese-Canadians endured as "enemy aliens" during World War II.

== Honours and awards ==
Mori was the recipient of a Queen Elizabeth II Golden Jubilee Medal for public service.

The Japanese government conferred the Order of the Rising Sun, Gold and Silver Rays, which represents the fifth highest of eight classes associated with the award. This decoration recognized his efforts in promoting relations between Canada and Japan.

== Selected works ==
- Kenzo Mori and Hiroto Takami. (1977). Kanada no Manzo Monogatari: The First Immigrant to Canada. Nagasaki: Osuzuyama Shobo.
- Original title in Japanese; 森研三; 高見弘人 (1977). 『カナダの万蔵物語』. 長崎: 尾鈴山書房 (おすずやましょぼう). NDC9=289.1.

== See also ==
- Manzo Nagano
- Kuchinotsu
