= Tomori Nagamoto =

Japanese visual artist and poet

Tomori Nagamoto 永本 冬森
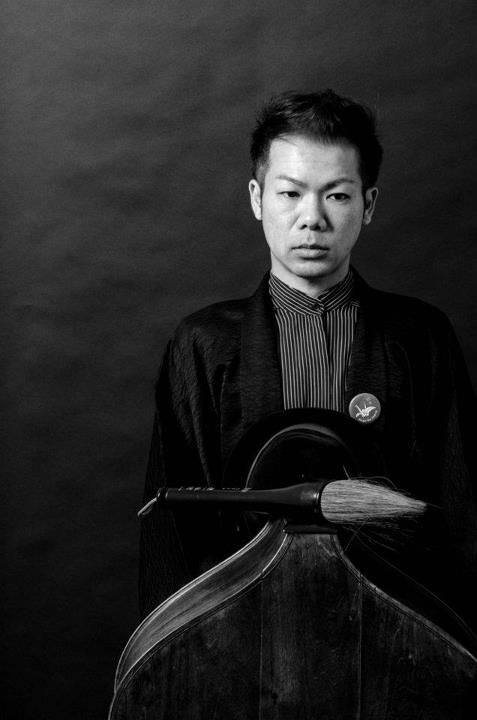
- Born: Tomori Nagamoto; December 10, 1973 (age 52); Hokkaido, Hamatonbetsu, Japan
- Other name: tomolennon
- Occupations: Visual artist, poet, musician

Tomori Nagamoto (永本 冬森, Nagatomo Tomori; born December 10, 1973 in Hokkaido, Japan) is a self-taught visual artist, poet, and musician.

== Art ==
Nagamoto's early work was often focused on urban figurative painting. His series of life-sized figurative portraits of dreaming girls entitled "Sleeping Beauty" was exhibited at Japanese Canadian Cultural Centre in 2007. His artwork was often created in collaboration with accomplished fashion industry artists, photographers, makeup artists, hairstylists, and fashion designers.

His first photography exhibition "Universe" continued in this fashion with photographic media. In large scale photographs, Nagamoto created portraits of the all encompassing dreams of youth, idealization and melancholy.

In 2008, Nagamoto started a new technique for his compositions; the use of ball-point pen and parchment. This style of art gained him critical success when he was featured on Bravo television in Star Portraits for his portrait of Canadian actor and icon Gordon Pinsent.

== Poetry ==
As a visual artist as well as poet, Nagamoto often creates artwork featuring quotations and Haiku. "Hitch-Haiku" is a series of selected Haiku masters from both the East and West, ancient and modern, include 17th century's first great master Matsuo Bashō and the beat icons Jack Kerouac and William S. Burroughs.

In 2008, he self-published a poetry/illustration book entitled "Bittersweet Hotel". His theatrical poetry reading performance premiered in Osaka, Japan.

His series "Life Lessons" is a project that aims to bridge the growing gap between the visual arts and literature by creating an artist book featuring hand-drawn portraits of historical icons past and present with their famous quotes. Currently running over 25 episodes (as of May 2012), Life Lessons in the Japanese edition was made into a magazine series which has been continuously published in Bits magazine, a Japanese cultural magazine published in Toronto, since 2009.

== Work with musicians ==
He often works and collaborates with musicians. He co-organized a Shogi (Japanese chess) performance event for girl punk legends Shonen Knife at the Gladstone Hotel, Toronto, in 2003. He directed a promotion video for "T-dog's theme" (2009) and design CD cover "JAfro" (2012) for his jazz pianist friend in New York, Toru Dodo. As art director, he contributed a charity compilation album for victims of Japan earthquake entitled "MapleLeaf RisingSun" (2012) which was produced by Canadian music producer and bassist George Koller and George Rondina of Number 9 Audio Group.

He was presented with the "Best Artist" award from Now in 2002 and Eye Weekly in 2003 as one of the best local visual artists of the year. He also won Artfocus Magazine's Best in Mixed Media Award (2003) and Best in Pastel/Oil Stick Award (2000)

== Other work ==
His work has been featured in design and set design on TV drama series Metropia (OMNI) in 2004.

His early work has been featured on cover of Canadian author Matthew Fox's Cities of Weather (Cormorant Books).

== Awards ==
Date	Award
2003	Best Visual Artist: EYE magazine reader’s poll
2003	Best in Mixed Media Award: Artfocus Magazine 12th Annual Show 2003
2002	Best Local Visual Artist: Now magazine reader’s poll
2000	Best in Pastel/Oil Stick Award: Artfocus Magazine 9th Annual Show

== Selected solo exhibitions ==
Date	Exhibitions
2013	2013 Sweet Capital, ArtBarrage, Toronto Canada
2012	2012 Life Lessons, Nuit Blanche, Toronto Canada]
2010	2010 Bittersweet Hotel, Gallery Cero, Osaka Japan
2009	Foreign Soil, Ouchi Gallery, New York CityA.
2009	Hitch-Haiku revisited, Keep Six Contemporary, Toronto, Canada
2008	Hitch-Haiku, Jerome Jenner Gallery, Toronto, Canada Show
2008	Sakura, upART Contemporary Art Fair, Gladstone Hotel, Toronto, Canada
2008	Sleeping Beauty Awaken, Keep Six Contemporary, Toronto, Canada
2008	Universe. G+Galleries, Toronto, Canada
2008	AWAKE, Art x Life gallery, Tokyo, Japan
2007	Back to Roots, Swansea Town Hall, Toronto, Canada
2007	Sleeping Beauty, Japanese Canadian Cultural Centre, Toronto, Canada
2004	Smoke Screen, Wagner Rosenbaum Gallery, Toronto, Canada
