= Jodo Shinshu Buddhist Temples of Canada =

The Jodo Shinshu Buddhist Temples of Canada, formerly the Buddhist Churches of Canada, are a group of temples and fellowships that are affiliated with the Nishi Hongan-ji of Kyoto, Japan, the mother temple of the Jodo Shinshu (True Pure Land) sect of Buddhism.

Groups follow the interpretation of the Buddha-Dharma according to Shinran Shonin (1173–1262), the founder of Jodo Shinshu Buddhism. Shinran promoted the principle of "dependent co-arising" as the basis for individual liberation. He attempted to understand the dharma in view of his own existence and thus derived the Nembutsu (recitation of "Namu Amida Butsu": Amitabha Buddha's name) teaching, which he emphasized as an expression of thanks and joy in realizing the interrelated nature of human existence.

Established in 1933, it is the oldest Buddhist organization in Canada.

The national office for the Jodo Shinshu Buddhist Temples of Canada is located in Richmond, British Columbia.

== History ==
Japanese Canadians first established Buddhism in Canada during the late 1800s as new immigrants gathered in homes. The Jodo Shinshu tradition likely resided in British Columbia as early as 1889, when the first Japanese consulate was established.

The Reverend Senju Sasaki and his wife Tomie arrived in Vancouver, British Columbia on October 12, 1905, and immediately set about bringing Jodo Shinshu Buddhism to Canada. By December 12, 1905 the first Buddhist Temple in Canada was established in the city.

Because it was identified with a particular ethnic group, this form of Buddhism did not become integrated into the Canadian society at that time.

During World War II, the internment of people of Japanese ancestry almost eradicated Japanese Buddhism and institutional Buddhism from Canada. The lifting of the War Measures Act in 1949 restored Japanese freedom of movement throughout Canada; some Japanese Buddhists returned to BC, many stayed in Alberta and others settled elsewhere.

Many temples now have a multicultural population consisting of Japanese, Japanese-Canadians and non-Japanese members. Multiple temples have branched out in British Columbia, Alberta, Manitoba, Ontario and Québec.

== Affiliated Temples and Fellowships ==
- Buddhist Temple of Southern Alberta
- Calgary Buddhist Temple
- Fraser Valley Buddhist Temple
- Hamilton Buddhist Temple
- Jodo Shinshu Buddhists of Thunder Bay
- Kamloops Buddhist Church
- Kelowna Buddhist Temple
- Manitoba Buddhist Temple
- Montreal Buddhist Church
- Steveston Buddhist Temple
- Toronto Buddhist Church
- Vancouver Buddhist Temple
- Vernon Buddhist Temple
