= Vancouver Japanese Language School =

- バンクーバー日本語学校
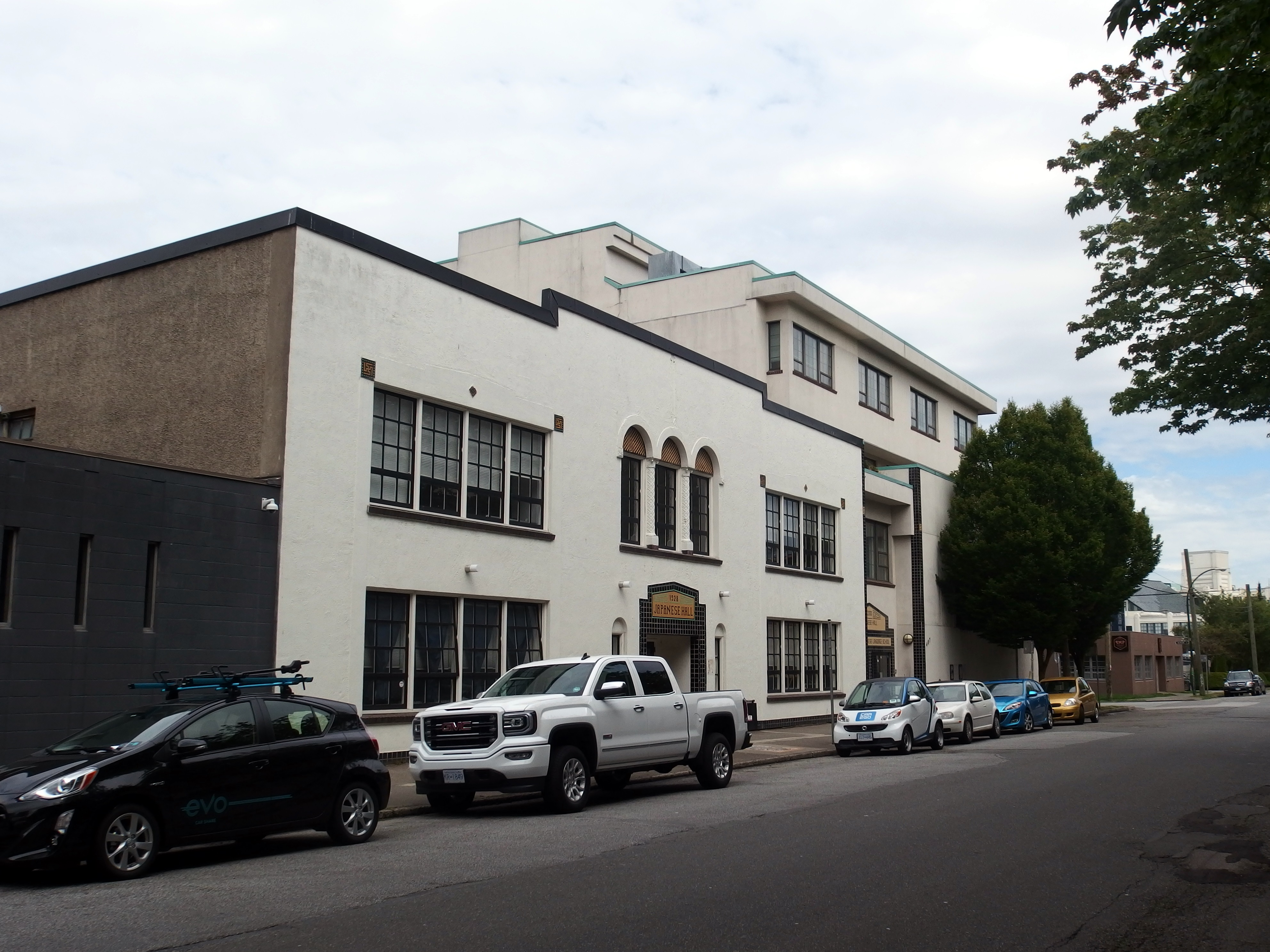
- Vancouver Japanese Language School

Location
- Vancouver, BC; Canada; 49.2841°N 123.0938°W

Information
- Established: 12 January 1906
- Website: vjls-jh.com

Vancouver Japanese Language School (バンクーバー日本語学校, Vancouver Nihongo Gakko) is a language school located in Japantown, Vancouver, BC. Founded in 1906 as Vancouver Kyoritsu Nihon Kokumin Gakko (晩香坡共立日本國民學校, Vancouver Japanese Citizens' School), it is the oldest Japanese language school in Canada.

== History ==
The school opened on January 12, 1906 as the Japanese Citizens' School, its construction having been funded by Japanese diplomat Marquis Komura Jutarō. It taught general subjects to Japanese-Canadians in the area as a full-time Japanese school following the Japanese curriculum. General subjects were dropped in 1919 in favour of teaching Japanese-Canadians both English and Japanese, and the school was renamed the Japanese Language School.

After the Pacific War broke out on December 7, 1941, the school was forced to close, and Japanese-Canadians were relocated the following year as part of Japanese-Canadian internment. The school was not re-opened until 1952, when it was temporarily housed at Vancouver Buddhist Church before returning to the VJLS building in 1953.

The existing building located on 475 Alexander Street in Vancouver is designated as a heritage building by the City of Vancouver as a symbol of Japanese-Canadian community and the internment. The building was named a National Historic Site on June 20, 2019, for its role as the oldest and largest Japanese language school in the country, but also because it is a rare documented case of property returned to Japanese-Canadians following the period of internment.

== Gallery ==
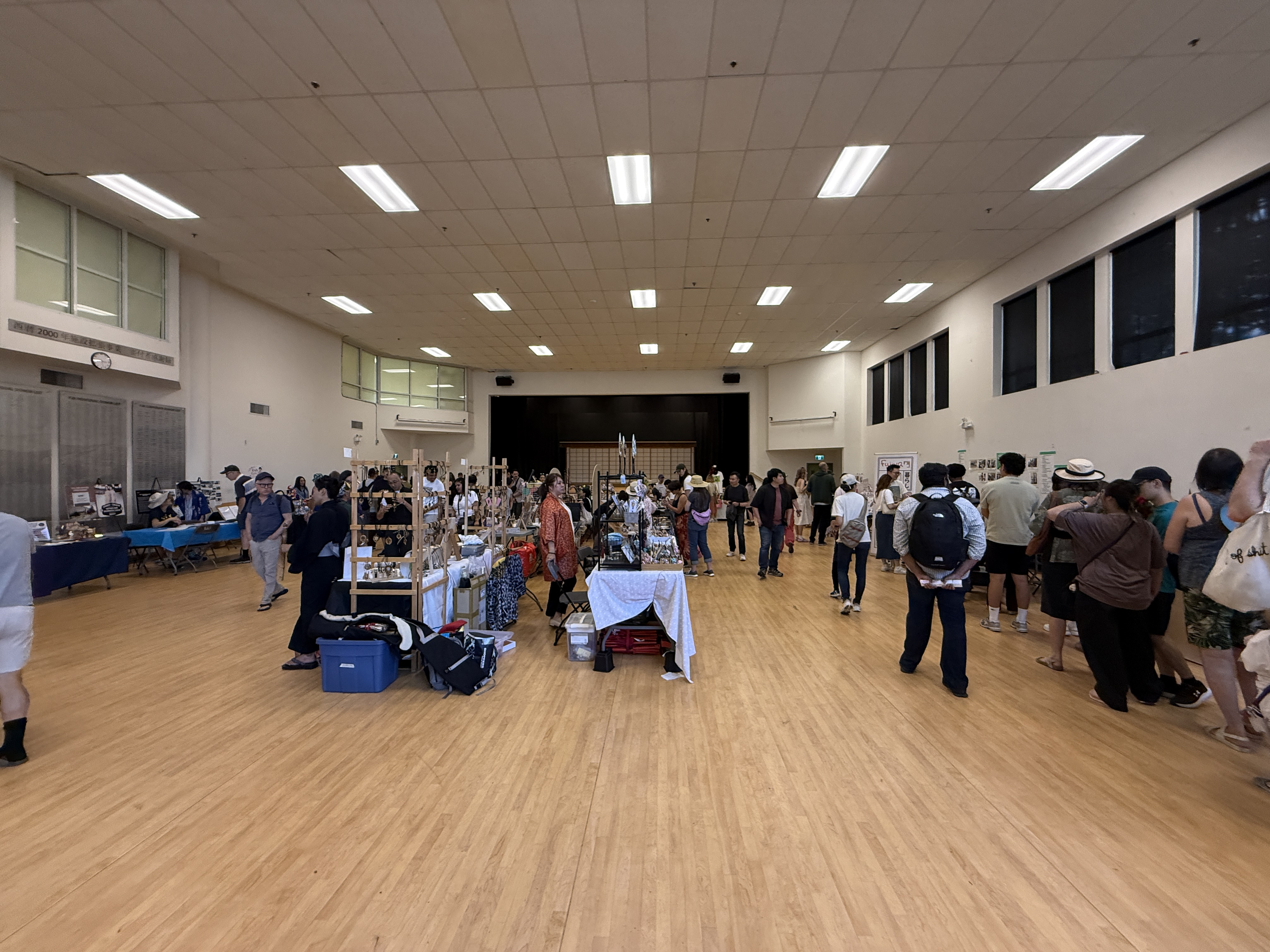
Hall

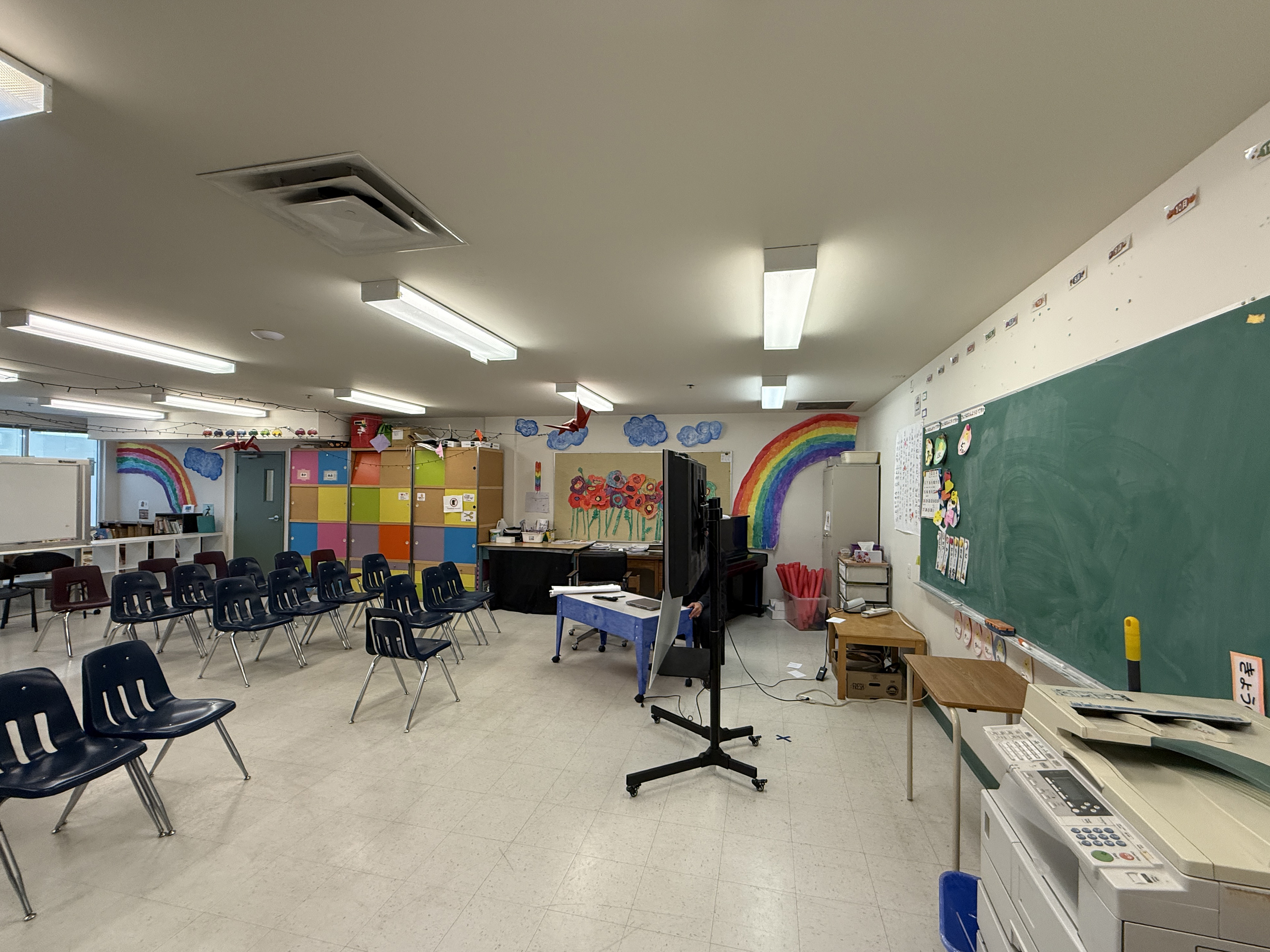
3/F George K Fujisawa Memorial Craft Room

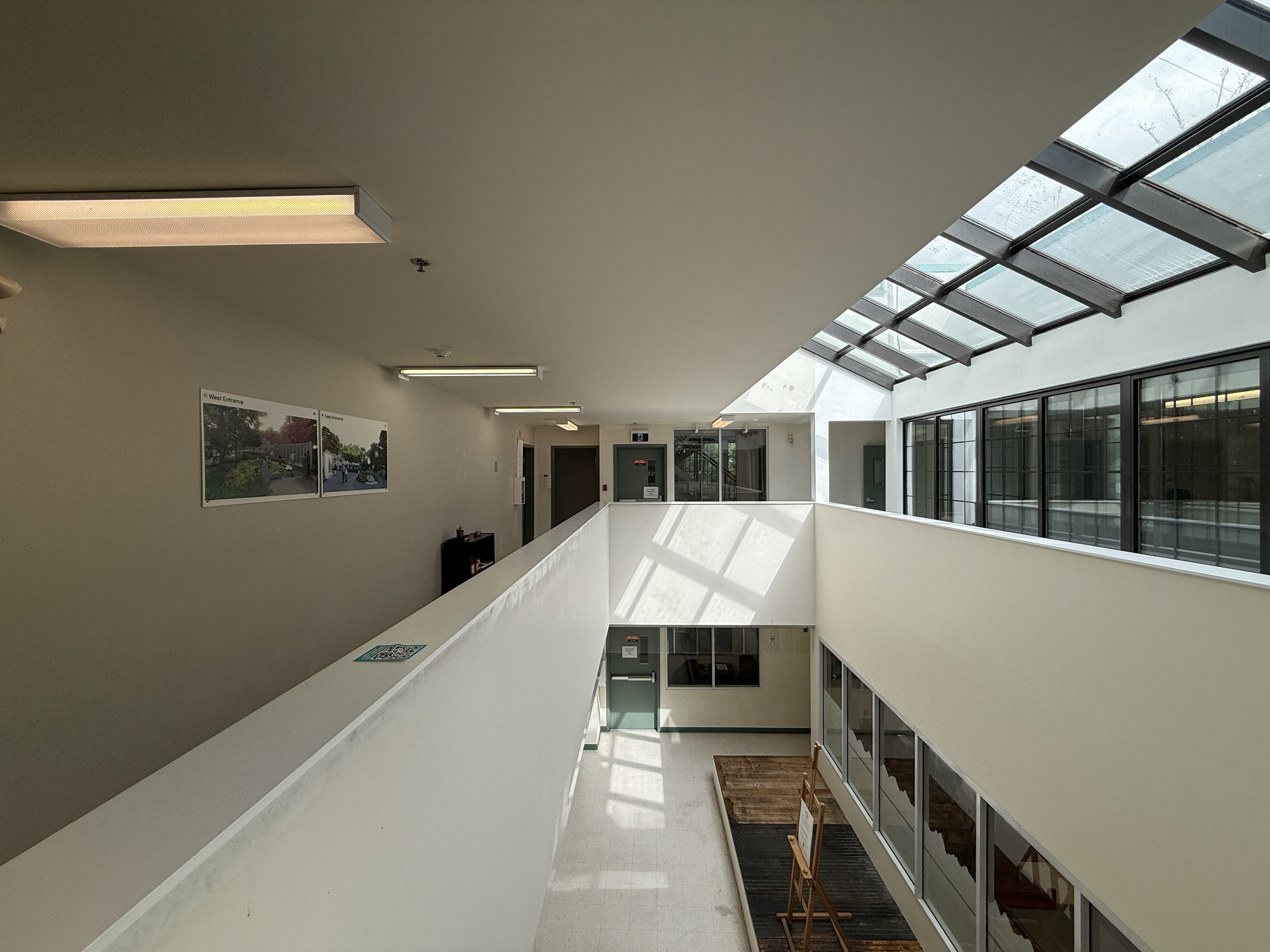
Void inside the school

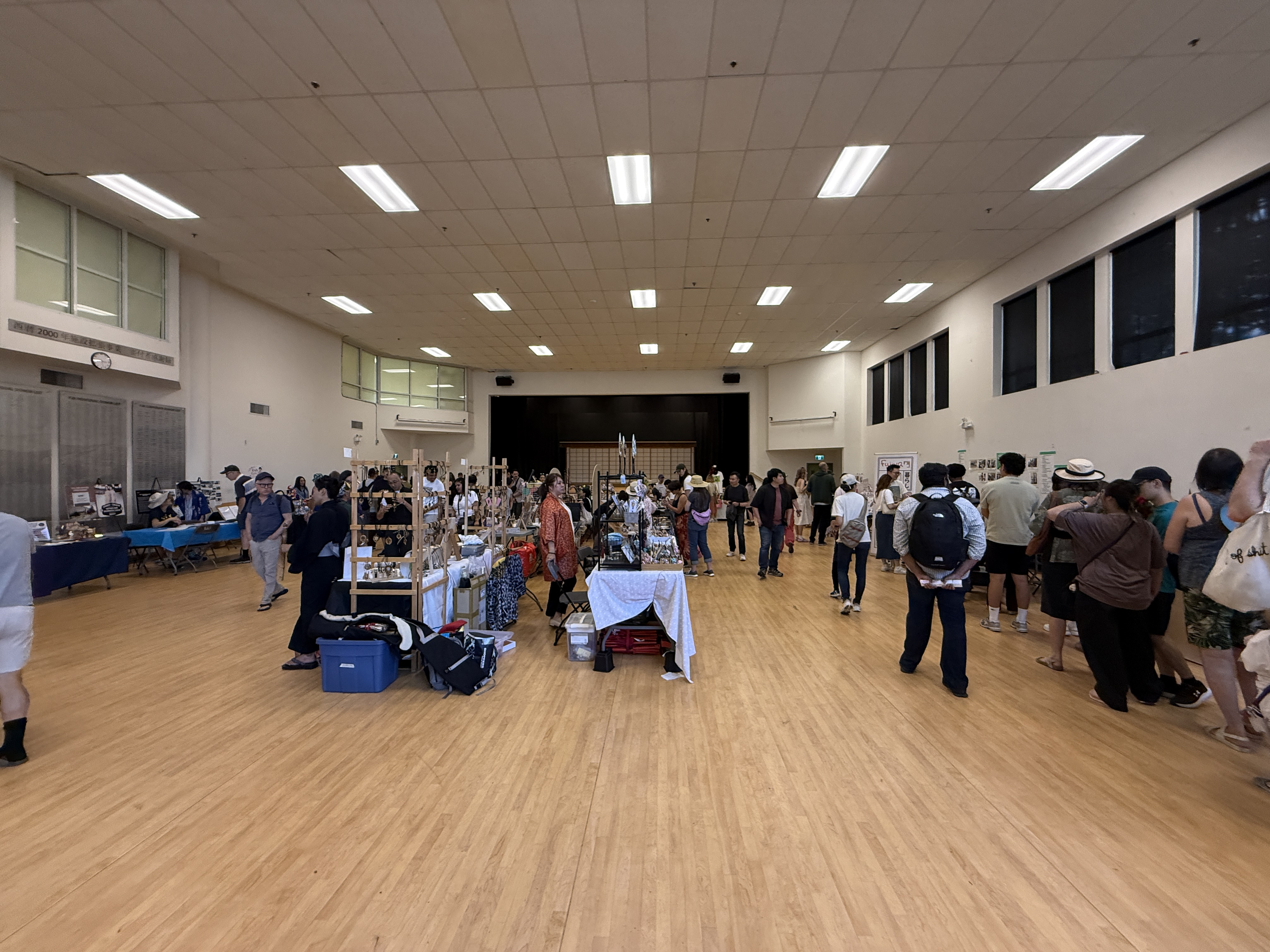
4/F art display during the open day

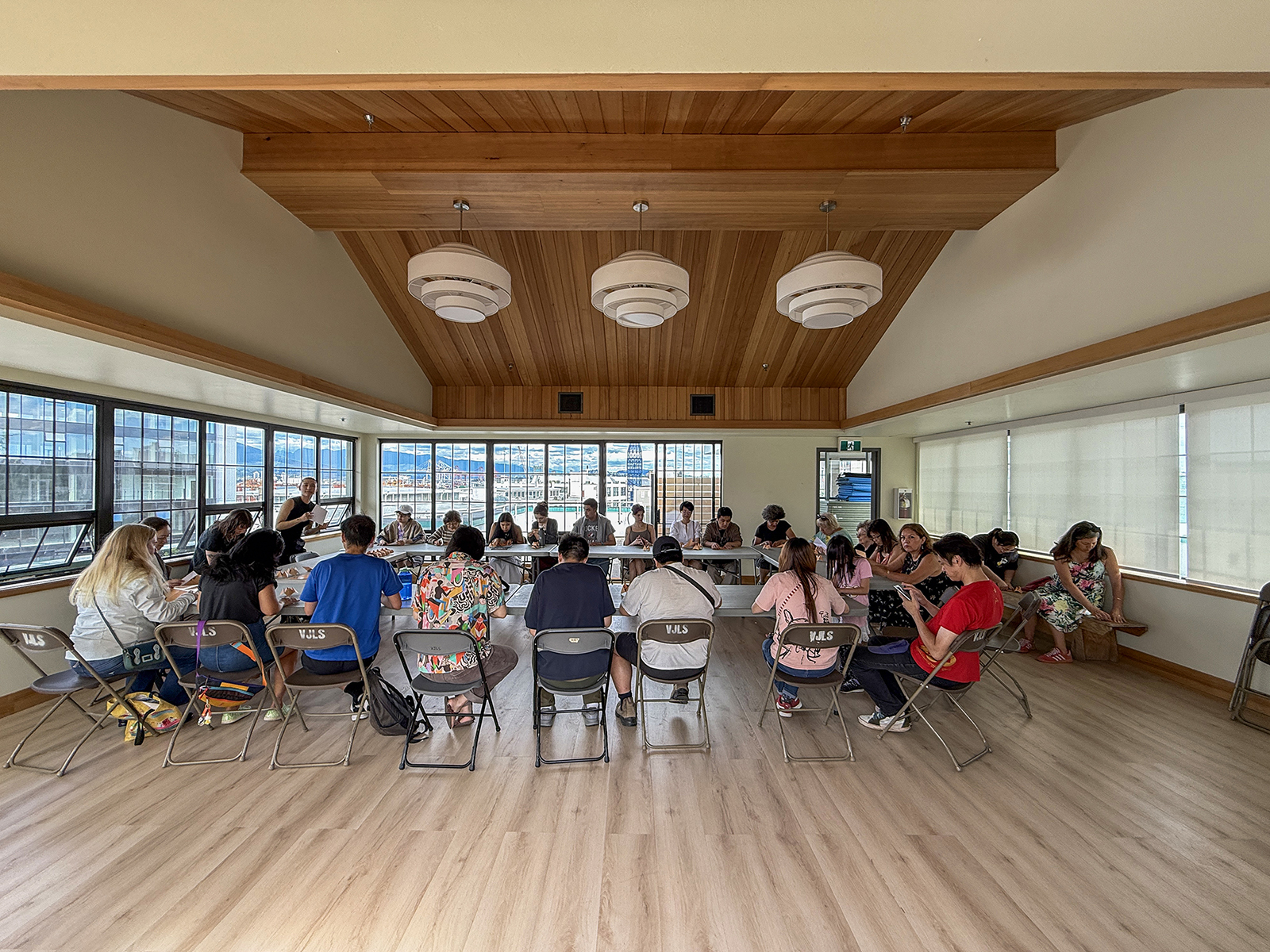
5/F activity room

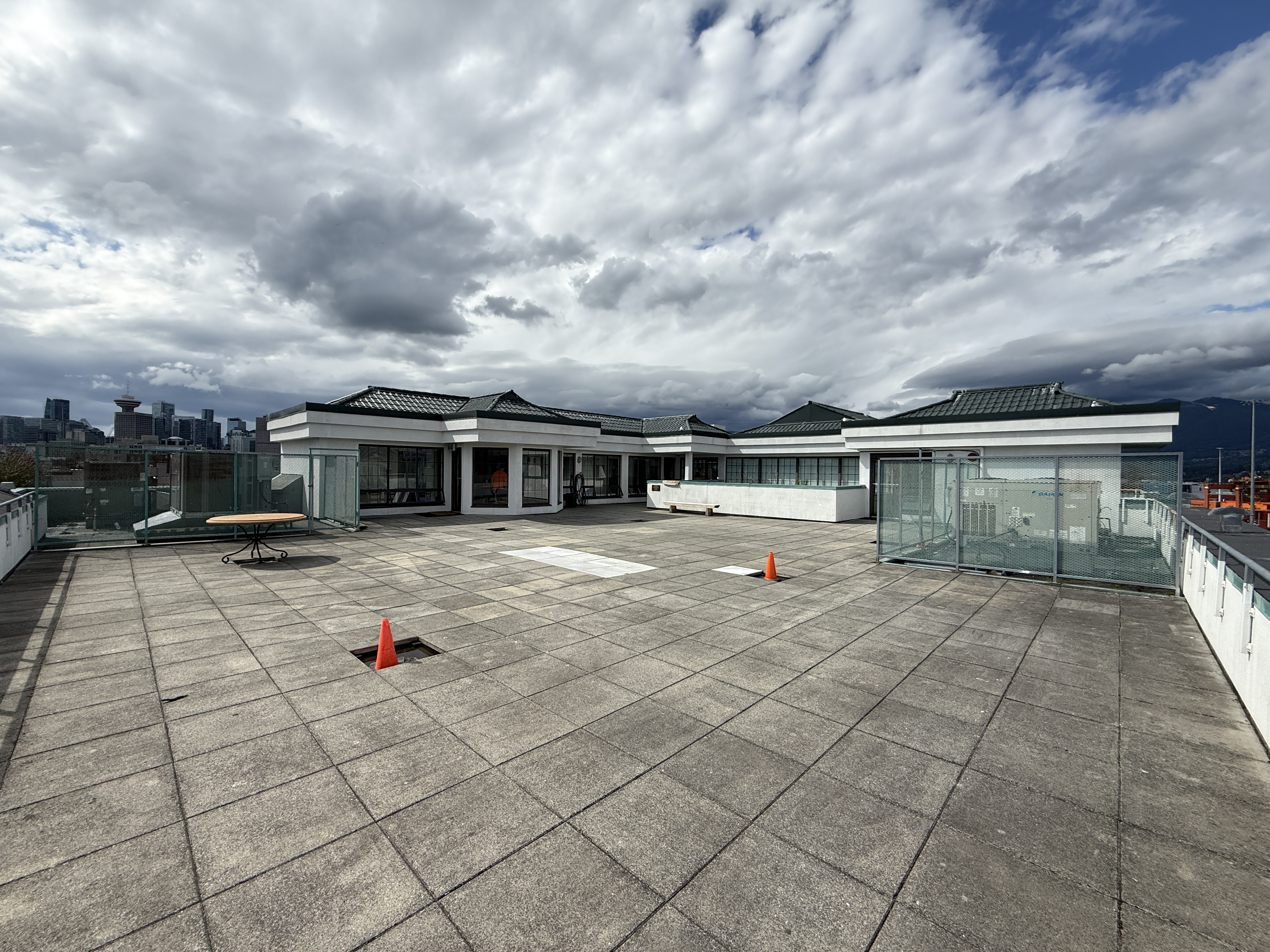
Rooftop
