= Marjorie Pigott =

Japanese-Canadian artist (1904–1990)

- Lyrical Fantasy, 1973, watercolour on wove paper
- Born: January 6, 1904; Yokohama, Japan
- Died: January 12, 1990; Toronto, Canada
- Style: Watercolour

Marjorie Pigott RCA (January 6, 1904, in Yokohama, Japan – January 12, 1990, in Toronto, Ontario, Canada) was a Japanese Canadian artist, who adapted Japanese watercolour techniques to paint Canadian scenes.

Marjorie Pigott was born to an English father and a Japanese mother, who, recognizing Pigott's artistic talent, sent her to study with master artists at the Nanga School, founded in the 15th century. Her mother was of noble birth and their home was filled with ancient Japanese treasures, which were mostly destroyed during the 1923 Great Kantō earthquake.

After 12 years of study, Pigott was designated a Nanga master herself. With World War II looming, Pigott left Japan together with her sister Edith, arriving in Vancouver in 1940 and settling in Toronto. From 1955 to 1965 she taught the Nanga technique to Japanese in Canada. She started painting Canadian scenes, such as the landscapes around Muskoka, using the Nanga technique and gradually developed her own style of semi-abstract wet-into-wet watercolour painting.

Her work was exhibited in several solo exhibitions and group shows in Canada. Her work is represented in collections of the National Gallery of Canada among others. She was a member of and exhibited her work with the Canadian Society of Painters in Water Colour and the Ontario Society of Artists. She was elected to the Royal Canadian Academy of Arts in 1973.

== Solo exhibitions ==
Her solo exhibitions include the following:

- 1962, 1964, 1966, 1968 – Roberts Gallery, Toronto
- 1969 – Kensington Fine Arts Gallery, Calgary
- 1970 – Roberts Gallery, Toronto
- 1971 – Wallack Gallery, Ottawa
- 1972 – Gallery Fore, Winnipeg; Kensington Fine Arts Gallery, Calgary; Roberts Gallery, Toronto
- 1973 – Wallack Gallery, Ottawa
- 1974 – Roberts Gallery, Toronto
- 1975 – Wallack Gallery, Ottawa

== Group exhibitions ==
Her group exhibitions include the following:

- 1961 – 4th Biennial Exhibition of Canadian Art, Ottawa; Canadian National Exhibition Art Gallery, Toronto; London Regional Art Gallery
- 1962, 1963 – Annuals of the Art Gallery of Hamilton
- 1964 – Spring Exhibition of Montreal Museum of Fine Arts; St. Catharines Arts Council
