= David Akutagawa =

Canadian martial artist

David Akutagawa (1937–2008) was a Japanese Canadian martial artist active during the late 20th century.

== Early life ==
Born in 1937, Akutagawa first came to Canada after receiving a degree in Economic Science from Kohnan University in Kobe, Japan. His karate background at that time was in Shitō-ryū and Shōtōkan-ryū styles.

== Career ==
He held 8th Dan in Shitō-ryū was 6th dan, shihan, and renshi in Chitō-ryū; his karate history spanned a half-century.

In 1967, he began teaching karate at the RCMP Self Defense Depot in Penhold, Alberta and at the RCMP Academy in Regina, Saskatchewan. He taught the RCMP Instructors there for over a decade.

In order to further his karate career, Akutagawa traveled to Toronto to meet and train under Masami Tsuruoka, the "Father of Canadian Karate", as well as the head instructor of Chitō-ryū in Canada. In 1966, Tsuroka introduced Akutagawa to Tsuyoshi Chitose, founder and supreme instructor of Chitō-ryū. Thus began Akutagawa's training in Chitō-ryū, until Chitose's death in July 1984. Akutagawa resigned from the International Chito-kai in December 1996 and founded the Renshikan (連士舘) Karate Association in January 1997. On June 1, 2006, Sōke Kenei Mabuni of Shitō-ryū Karate-dō promoted Akutagawa to 8th Dan and Shihan. Akutagawa also enjoyed studying Okinawan Kobudō, iaidō and jūjutsu with various experts.

== Death ==
On Wednesday, October 8, 2008, Akutagawa suffered a massive heart attack and died at the Vancouver General Hospital.

== Sources ==
- Colling, Michael, Chitose Tsuyoshi – A Bridge Through Time
- Organizations and Instructors with direct ties to Chitō-ryū Karate-do, archived from the original on 2007-10-08
- Colling, Michael; Schmidt, Don, Chitō-ryū Diversity
- "Karate Celebrations" (PDF), Karate BC News, p. 8, July 2007, archived from the original (PDF) on 2007-08-08
