= Hide Hyodo Shimizu =

Japanese-Canadian educator and activist

Hide Hyodo Shimizu CM (1908–1999) was a Japanese-Canadian educator and activist. She was an advocate for Japanese-Canadian rights and enfranchisement, and during World War II she established and operated schools for Japanese-Canadian children in internment camps. Shimizu was later awarded the Order of Canada for her work.

== Early life ==
Hide Hyodo (later Shimizu) was born in 1908 to Hideichi and Toshi Hyodo in Vancouver, British Columbia. Her parents, Hideichi and Toshi Hyodo, had emigrated from Uwajima, Japan, and Hide was the first of their eight children.

Shimizu studied at the University of British Columbia for a year, but transferred to a teacher's training school after tuition fees became too high. In 1926, Shimizu became one of the first Nisei (second-generation Japanese-Canadians) to earn a teacher's certificate. She began teaching a grade 1 class of Japanese-Canadian students at Lord Byng School in Steveston, B.C., a task she found challenging at first, because the students were fluent in Japanese – a language that Shimizu herself didn't know. She continued to teach at the school until 1942.

== Advocacy ==
=== Enfranchisement ===
In 1936, when the Elections and Franchise Acts Committee in the House of Commons was debating whether or not to extend voting rights to Asian immigrants and their descendants, Shimizu was asked by the Japanese Canadian Citizens League to join a small delegation travelling to Ottawa. Shimizu and her three companions each gave a short presentation to the committee in support of enfranchisement. The committee did not end the franchise ban, however, and the delegation returned home disappointed.

=== World War II ===
In 1941, the Canadian government began requiring all Japanese-Canadians older than 16 to register with the Royal Canadian Mounted Police, and Shimizu's parents were forced to give up their land and house.

When Japanese-Canadian families were moved into detention camps, their children were pulled out of school. In response, Shimizu recruited 120 Japanese teachers – many of them young high-school graduates or students themselves – and proceeded to train them in preparing and delivering school assignments. Working under the supervision of the British Columbia Securities Commission, Shimizu established a system of schools for approximately 3,000 Japanese-Canadian children within the internment camps, sending her newly-trained teachers to all the different camp locations. The schools operated out of small shacks that held only 20 students, and they used discarded textbooks donated by the Vancouver School Board. Shimizu visited the camps herself every month, commuting between Steveston and Vancouver, even as she was obliged to keep to a strict 9 pm curfew every night.

== Post-war work ==
After the war, Shimizu moved to Toronto. In 1948, she married Reverend Kosaburo Shimizu, a widowed United Church minister with four children of his own. They lived together until Reverend Kosaburo's death in 1962. Shimizu continued to play an active role in her community, and she lobbied the government to provide compensation for the harms done and property seized from Japanese-Canadians during the war.

In 1982, Shimizu was awarded the Order of Canada for her efforts to provide education for Japanese-Canadian children in internment camps.

Shimizu died in Nepean on August 22, 1999, aged 91.

== Legacy ==
In 1993, Shimizu was included in a list of women recognized by Status of Women Canada as having contributed to Canada's history and development. A few years later, at the Lord Byng School, school officials dedicated a traditional Japanese rock garden in her honour.

The Greater Toronto Chapter of the National Association of Japanese Canadians (NAJC) and the Hastings Park Foundation now jointly offer a scholarship for Japanese-Canadian students in memory of Hide Hyodo Shimizu.
