= The Kappa Child =

2001 novel by Hiromi Goto

The Kappa Child is a novel by Hiromi Goto, published in 2001. Goto's novel focuses on a Japanese-Canadian woman and her family. The narrator believes herself to have immaculately conceived a kappa.

The novel won the 2001 James Tiptree Jr. Award for Science Fiction and Commonwealth Writers.
