= Manzo Nagano =

First Japanese emigrant to Canada

Manzo Nagano (永野 万蔵, Nagano Manzō; 1855–1923) was the first Japanese person to officially immigrate to Canada.

== Biography ==
Manzo Nagano was born in Kuchinotsu [Minamishimabara], Nagasaki Prefecture on 26 November 1853. He emigrated from Japan to Canada in May 1877, arriving in New Westminster, British Columbia. He initially worked as a salmon fisherman in the Fraser River and later moved to Vancouver, where he loaded timber onto ships. In 1886, he returned to Japan to marry 17-year-old Tsuya Ichi. Nagano's first son, George Tatsuo, was born on 9 December 1887. Tsuya Ichi died shortly after.

Between 1886 and 1892, Nagano frequently operating between Japan and North America, he began a series of businesses including salmon exports from Canada, a restaurant and tobacco business in Seattle, Washington, a Western-style restaurant in Yokohama and an enterprise (J.M. Nagano & Company) in Victoria, which operated two gift shops, a Japanese food store, and a hotel. His company was the largest employer of Japanese in the city. Nagano and his third wife, Tayoko, had a son, Frank Terumaro, on 3 October 1898. By 1920, Nagano had contracted tuberculosis. In 1922, he lost all his possessions in a fire at his shop at 1501 Government Street, Victoria. He returned to Japan with his family, where he died in May 1924 at the age of 68. Several of his descendants live in Canada today.

Nagano's wife Tsuya and his 7-month-old daughter, Haru, are buried in the Ross Bay Cemetery, Victoria.

In his honour, the Canadian Mount Manzo Nagano, located near Owikeno Lake, BC, was officially named to commemorate the arrival of Japanese immigrants to Canada.

The figure skater Keegan Messing is his great-great-grandson.

== Sources ==
- Mori, Kenzo and Hiroto Takami. (1977). Kanada no Manzo Monogatari: The First Immigrant to Canada. Tokyo: Suzuyama Shobo.
- Nakayama, Gordon G. (1984). Issei, Stories of Japanese Canadian Pioneers. Toronto: NC Press, Second revised edition.
