= Christine Yoshikawa =

Canadian American classical pianist

Christine Mari Yoshikawa (born in Vancouver, British Columbia, Canada) is a Canadian American classical pianist.

== Biography ==
Born into a musical family to a Japanese mother and a Canadian father, Christine Yoshikawa began her musical studies at an early age. She began her piano studies at the age of two with her mother and the violin at the age of six. At the age of four, she made her stage debut and by the age of six, she had already won many first prizes at the Kiwanis Competition, BCRMTA, the VCC Young Artist Competition and the grand prize at the Canadian National Music Competitions among others. At the age of eight, her family moved to Tokyo (Japan) for two years, and at the age of nine, she made her concerto debut in Tokyo performing Piano Concerto No. 1 by Ludwig van Beethoven. On her return, she went on to receive first class honors and diplomas from the Western Board of Music and the Royal School of Music in London.

She has also studied at the Banff Centre for the Performing Arts with the late Gyorgy Sebok of Indiana University Bloomington, the Kromeriz International Piano Academy in the Czech Republic with various piano masters and at the Toradze Institute of Indiana University South Bend organised by eminent Russian pianist Alexander Toradze. She also holds degrees with first class honours from the University of Victoria, the University of British Columbia and Arizona State University under the tutelage of Arthur Rowe, Jane Coop and Robert Hamilton.

A winner of numerous national and international competitions, she has performed around the world as a recitalist, chamber musician and soloist with many renowned orchestras in many prestigious concert halls including the Olomouc Philharmonic Hall, the Salle Octave Crémazie of the Grand Théâtre de Québec, and the Chan Shun Concert Hall. In 2005, the Eroica record label signed her to record the piano music of Sergei Rachmaninoff, Alexander Scriabin, Stephen Chatman, Phillip Neil Martin and Ned Rorem.

Currently, Yoshikawa serves on the faculties of Chipola College and Gulf Coast State College and tours regularly as part of the Romanenko-Yoshikawa Cello Piano Duo with Russian cellist Alexei Romanenko.

== Discography ==
- Black and White Fantasy - Canadian Music Centre, Music of Stephen Chatman (1998)
- Upon the Heavenly Sea: Music from Marylhurst (2004)
- A Chipola Family Christmas (2007)

== Recognitions ==
North American Research Scholar Award 2003: Philanthropic Education Organization – Mary Louise Remy Endowed Scholar:

- Rachmaninoff's Integrative Technique and Structural Organization: A Schenkerian Analysis of Allegro Moderato, from Piano Sonata No. 1 in D Minor, Opus 28 (Sergei Rachmaninoff, Russia)
