= Betty Mochizuki =

Canadian painter and printmaker (born 1929)

Betty Ayako Mochizuki
- Born: October 31, 1929 (age 96); Vancouver, British Columbia, Canada
- Occupations: Artist, painter, printmaker
- Known for: Scented Memory (AGO)

Betty Ayako Mochizuki (born October 31, 1929) is a Canadian painter and printmaker. Mochizuki's works consist of predominantly watercolour paintings, oil paintings, and prints. Mochizuki was born in Vancouver. Mochizuki studied at the Ontario College of Art in Toronto, where she graduated in 1954, specializing in landscapes and still-life painting. Mochizuki was a member of the Canadian Society of Graphic Art until it disbanded. Betty Mochizuki and is an active member of the Canadian Society of Painters in Water Colour after being elected in 1960, and was also elected as a member of the Ontario Society of Artists in 1976. Mochizuki held several exhibitions with the Picture Loan Society and was a heavily involved member before its closing in 1968.

== Education ==
Betty Ayako Mochizuki studied at the Ontario College of Art and Design in Toronto. Mochizuki graduated in 1954, specializing in landscapes and still-life paintings. Throughout her life, she studied under Canadian Artists Jock Macdonald and Jack Nichols.

== Artwork and mentions ==
Betty Mochizuki is noted for her lively and impressionistic landscape designs, as well as her paintings of flowers and graphic-styled still life works. Mochizuki's work touches on her family's Japanese heritage, and the integration of multiple cultural backgrounds into one's own identity When questioned about her works' stylistically eastern influences, she replied that "it just comes out that way." Mochizuki's unnamed pen and ink drawing, which depicts several whales playing within an amulet, is featured in the poetry anthology book Whale Sound. The work reflects Mochizuki's printmaking skill, illustrating her understanding of defined and steady line-work. Mochizuki's oil painting Scented Memory is currently displayed in the Art Gallery of Ontario, which was donated as a gift from Douglas M. Duncan's personal collection after his death. In the book by Joan Murray, Confessions of a Curator, a painting by Mochizuki is mentioned, though the title is not stated. The work is recalled as a favourite of the MP's receptionist, who refused to let it be taken back after the Art Gallery of Ontario had lent it. A short biography on Mochizuki is published in the fourth volume of A Dictionary of Canadian Artists.

== Exhibitions and reception ==
Mochizuki held several solo exhibitions with the Picture Loan Society in 1955, 1958, 1960, and 1976. Mochizuki featured her Oil Painting Cycle in the Canadian Group of Painters Exhibition in 1962 and 1963, which showcased her ability to depict abstract content among her collection of landscapes, and indicates a great range of versatility. Mochizuki's work was frequently featured in exhibitions held by the Canadian Society of Painters in Water Colour. Mochizuki held several solo shows, one of which was composed solely of her oil paintings, and another that showcased her works in watercolour. In 1976, Mochizuki held another solo show of her paintings and drawings at the Sisler Gallery in Toronto. Mochizuki's watercolours displayed at her solo Watercolour Exhibition in 1960 were noted for their technical excellence, though she was criticized for deriving much inspiration from the works of others. Despite criticism, she was considered an artist to watch, and Colin Sabiston stated that he believed she would rank well in later years. Another critic noted Mochizuki's work as being graceful, yet vivacious, with her landscape and flower paintings being stated as having charm and delicacy. Two of Mochizuki's landscape paintings featured in the Jack Sullivan Sculpture Exhibit in 1965 were "especially worth mentioning" and were considered a notable attraction amongst the other works. In 1962, Mochizuki was awarded the C.W. Jeffery's Award for Outstanding Graphic Art for her work Most of Mochizuki's work is kept in private collections, however several of her pieces are currently displayed at University of Toronto, Judith & Norman Alix Art Gallery, Sarnia, Museum London, and the Art Gallery of Ontario.
