= Kenji Fusé =

Canadian violist and composer

Kenji Fusé is a Canadian violist, conductor and composer living in Victoria, British Columbia, Canada. He currently holds the position of principal viola with the Victoria Symphony Orchestra. In 2025 he was appointed music director of the Strathcona Symphony Orchestra, in Courtenay, BC. Fusé has performed the Jacques Hétu Viola Concerto in BC, Canada, with conductor Alain Trudel and the Victoria Symphony Orchestra (2011). He has performed his own viola concerto with the same orchestra, under the direction of both Glen Fast (1993) and the dynamic young Music Director Designate of the venerable Philadelphia Orchestra, Yannick Nézet-Séguin (2005).
