= Japanese in New York City =

Ethnic group

Japanese in New York City ニューヨーク市における日本人移民
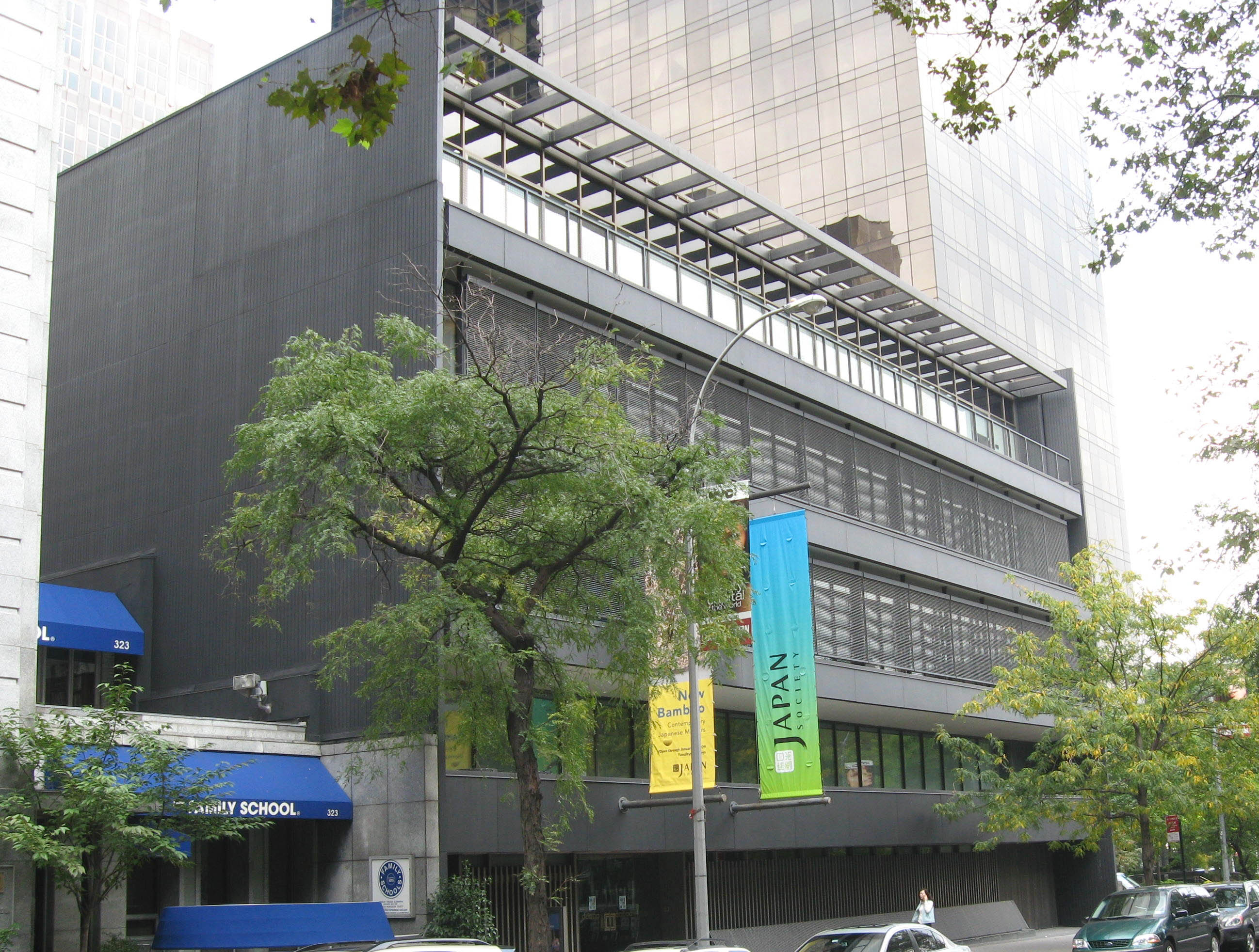
- The Japan Society in Manhattan

Total population
- 37,279 (2000)

Languages
- English, Japanese, and Okinawan

Religion
- Buddhism, Christianity, Shintoism, Atheism

As of the 2000 Census, over half of the 37,279 people of Japanese ancestry in the U.S. state of New York lived in New York City. As of 2012, the New York City metropolitan area was home to the largest Japanese community on the East Coast of the United States. The community has grown to the point that the first annual Japan Day Parade, the largest outside Japan, took place in Manhattan in 2022.

== History ==
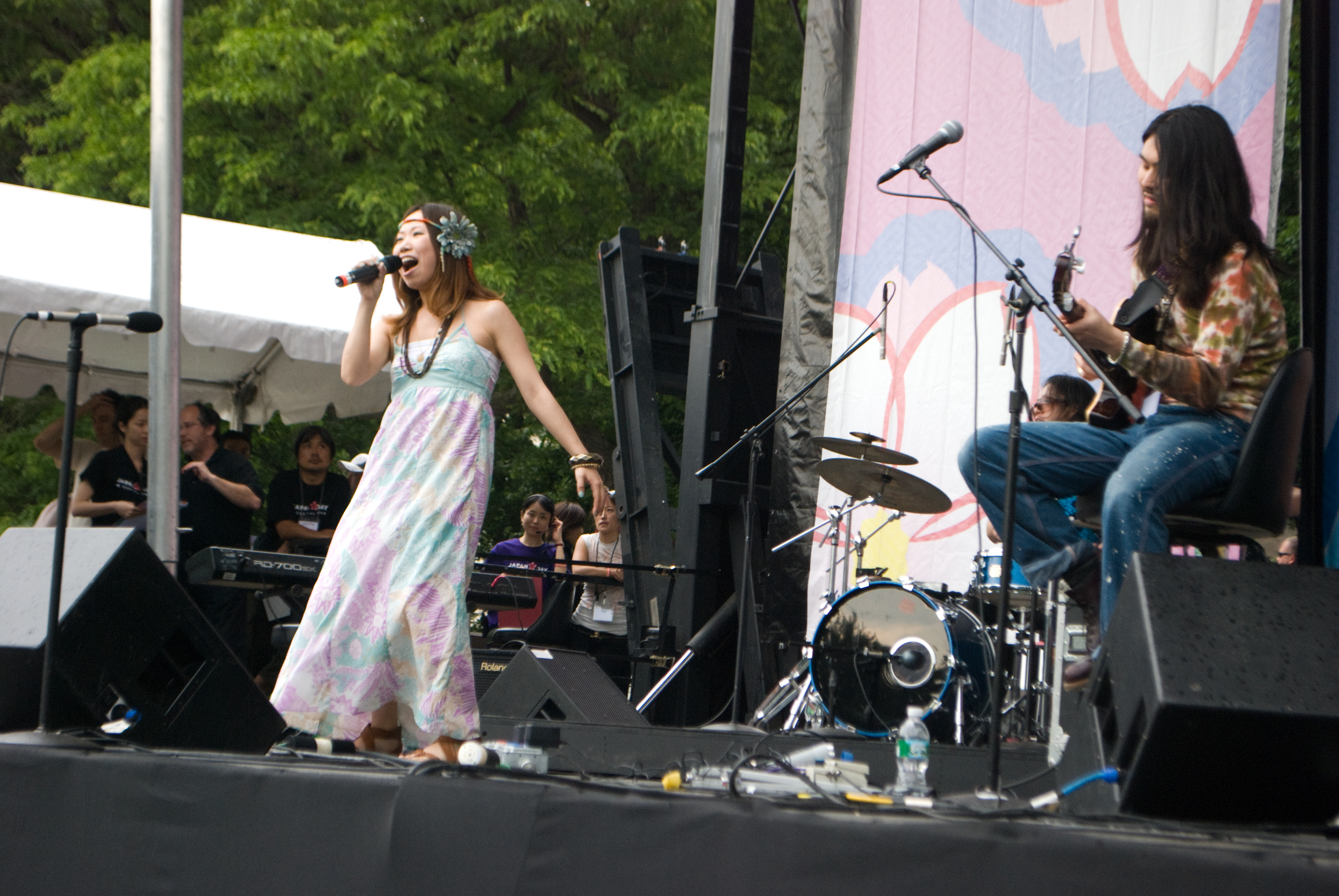
Japan Day performance in Central Park, 2009

In 1876, six Japanese businessmen arrived in New York City on the Oceanic and established companies. They were the first Japanese people in the state of New York. Almost all of the 1,000 issei in New York State by 1900 were in New York City. The Chinese Exclusion Acts of 1882 restricted Japanese immigration to the United States and the United States and Japanese governments had a gentlemen's agreement where the Japanese would deny visas to laborers wishing to immigrate to the United States in exchange for the U.S. not officially ending Japanese immigration. For those reasons, before the 1950s New York City had few Japanese immigrants. Japanese individuals of higher socioeconomic backgrounds did enter New York City during that period. Until the 1960s there was never a greater number than 5,000 Japanese people in New York State.

The National Origins Act of 1924 officially barred Japanese immigration into the United States. By the 1920s, Issei with high socioeconomic status had moved to Long Island and to New Rochelle and Scarsdale in Westchester County.

After the attack on Pearl Harbor in 1941 the Japanese consulate in New York City closed. Several Japanese businesses closed as well. The overall New York State Japanese population was not mass-interned. Issei community leaders were interned at Ellis Island. After the internment of Japanese Americans ended, New York's Japanese community accepted the arrivals who had formerly been interned.

Japanese officials connected with the United Nations arrived in the 1950s and businesspeople associated with Japanese companies began arriving in the late 1950s. Japanese immigrants became the main presence of Japanese communities after the passage of the Immigration and Nationality Act of 1965. By 1988 there were 50,000 Japanese businesspersons working in Greater New York City, with 77% of them being temporary employees with plans to return to Japan. At that time employees of Japanese companies and their families were over 80% of the Japanese residents of the New York City area. About 25% of Japanese residents in the New York City metropolitan area had considered and/or decided to stay in the United States permanently. The first annual Japan Day Parade, the largest outside Japan, took place in Manhattan in 2022.

== Commerce ==
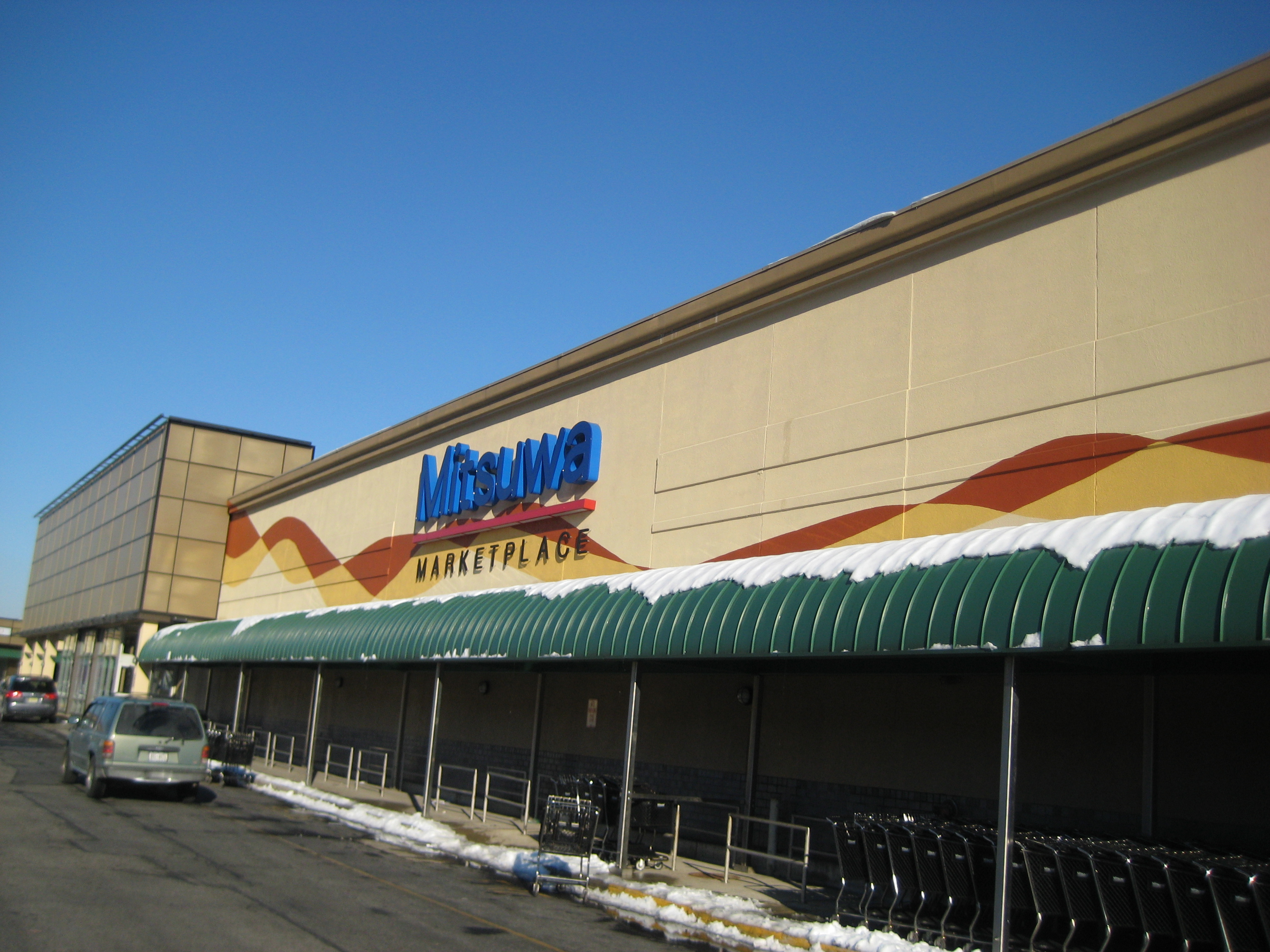
Mitsuwa in Edgewater, New Jersey

The oldest Japanese grocery in the United States, is Katagiri Grocery on East 59th Street. Established in 1907, it was founded by two immigrant brothers from Japan. The two stores have been providing Japanese groceries to New Yorkers in Manhattan as early as 1907 until today. At that time, they also served premium imported coffee and tea to New Yorkers as they didn't have many Japanese customers. They expanded their operations, and the service scope to include tableware, books, and clothes in addition to fresh Asian vegetables, Japanese sushi, bento, and other Japanese groceries.

In March 2011, Sam Dolnick and Kirk Semple of The New York Times wrote that the "prominent outpost of Japanese culture" in New York City was a group of sake bars and sushi restaurants in the East Village neighborhood of Manhattan. In December 2014, Pete Wells of The Times heralded the new clusters of Japanese restaurants in the East Village and on the east side of Midtown Manhattan for their variety of dishes and the excellence of their food; this latter neighborhood in Midtown East also houses the Japan Society and the Consulate-General of Japan in New York City, as well as Japanese cafes, markets, and corporate offices, although it is not formally recognized as a Japantown.

As of 2002, there were 2,528 Japanese citizens employed by 273 companies in the states of New York, New Jersey, and Connecticut.

The Japanese Chamber of Commerce and Industry of New York stated that in 1992 357 companies had operations in Greater New York City and these companies employed 6,048 Japanese nationals living in Greater New York City. The Japanese consulate in New York City stated that in 1992 there were about 16,000 Japanese people living in Westchester County, New York, and about 25-33% of the expatriates employed by the Japanese companies in the New York City area lived in Westchester County. Up to a few years before 2002, Japanese companies gave benefits to their staffs, and the annual supporting costs of a mid-level employee were about $50,000. The companies provided cars with full-time chauffeurs for senior staff and paid for golf club membership, magazine subscriptions, tuition for schools, and housing expenses for all employees.

By 2002 the Japanese presence in Westchester County decreased since many Japanese companies reduced or eliminated overseas departments due to the recession in Japan. Japanese companies also eliminated many benefits for their overseas staff. The population of Japanese citizens employed by the companies decreased 58% from 1992 to 2002.

== Geographic distribution ==
As of 2007, there were 51,705 Japanese persons living in the New York metropolitan area. As of 2026, Westchester County, New York and Bergen County, New Jersey had developed popular Japanese settlement areas.

As of 1988, ethnic Japanese often settled in certain suburban residential communities before ethnic Koreans began settling in the same areas. During that decade, Queens was the most common location for Japanese permanent residents, while wealthier temporary resident Japanese businesspeople tended to live in Westchester County. In general, ethnic Japanese residents were dispersed across various communities throughout the New York City metropolitan area.

=== Queens and Manhattan ===
As of 2011, within New York City the largest groups of Japanese residents were in Astoria, Queens, and Yorkville on the Upper East Side of Manhattan. According to the 2010 U.S. census, about 1,300 Japanese residents lived in Astoria and about 1,100 in Yorkville. Approximately 500 Japanese people lived in the East Village. As of that year, many short-term Japanese business executives in the Greater New York City area resided in Midtown Manhattan or in nearby suburbs.

In 2011, The New York Times wrote that, unlike some other ethnic groups in the New York City region, Japanese residents were relatively dispersed and lacked a single focal neighborhood comparable to Chinatown for the Chinese population. The relatively smaller size of the Japanese population contributed to this pattern; the newspaper estimated that there were about 20,000 Japanese residents in New York City compared with about 305,000 Chinese residents.

Clusters of Japanese restaurants and businesses have developed in the East Village and in Midtown East. Since around 2010, numerous Japanese restaurants have also opened in Manhattan's Koreatown, centered on West 32nd Street between Fifth Avenue and Sixth Avenue. Japanese cuisine has achieved notable recognition in New York City; in 2014, thirteen Japanese restaurants in Manhattan received Michelin stars.

=== Bergen County, New Jersey ===
As of 2011, the Japanese population in Bergen County, New Jersey, had rebounded to approximately 6,000 individuals. Dolnick and Semple of The New York Times wrote that Japanese supermarkets such as the Mitsuwa Marketplace in Edgewater, New Jersey, the largest Japanese-oriented shopping center on the U.S. East Coast, function as informal centers of Japanese cultural and commercial activity in the region. The Japanese-American Society of New Jersey is headquartered in Fort Lee.

In 1987 there were 1,800 Japanese national children in the North Jersey region.

=== Westchester County, New York ===
As of 2000, Japanese expatriates in Westchester County, New York lived mainly in Scarsdale. According to The New York Times, the area was well known in Japan for its housing and school systems, which attracted expatriate families.

Some Japanese residents also lived in nearby communities including Eastchester, Harrison, Hartsdale, and Rye.

The economic slowdown in Japan during the 1990s led to a decline in the Japanese population in Westchester County, and by 2002 some Japanese businesses and community activities had closed. However, according to the 2009–2013 American Community Survey, the number of Japanese residents had increased again to approximately 5,000 in Westchester County.

== Demographics ==
As of 2011, there were about 20,000 Japanese in New York City and a total of 45,000 in the Greater New York City area. Many of the Japanese are from transient groups such as university students, artists, and business workers. Many expatriate business executives and workers are posted to the United States for three to five year terms. As of 2011 65% of the Japanese in New York City have bachelor's degrees and the median income for Japanese over the age of 25 is $60,000. This is $10,000 above the citywide median income.

== Institutions ==
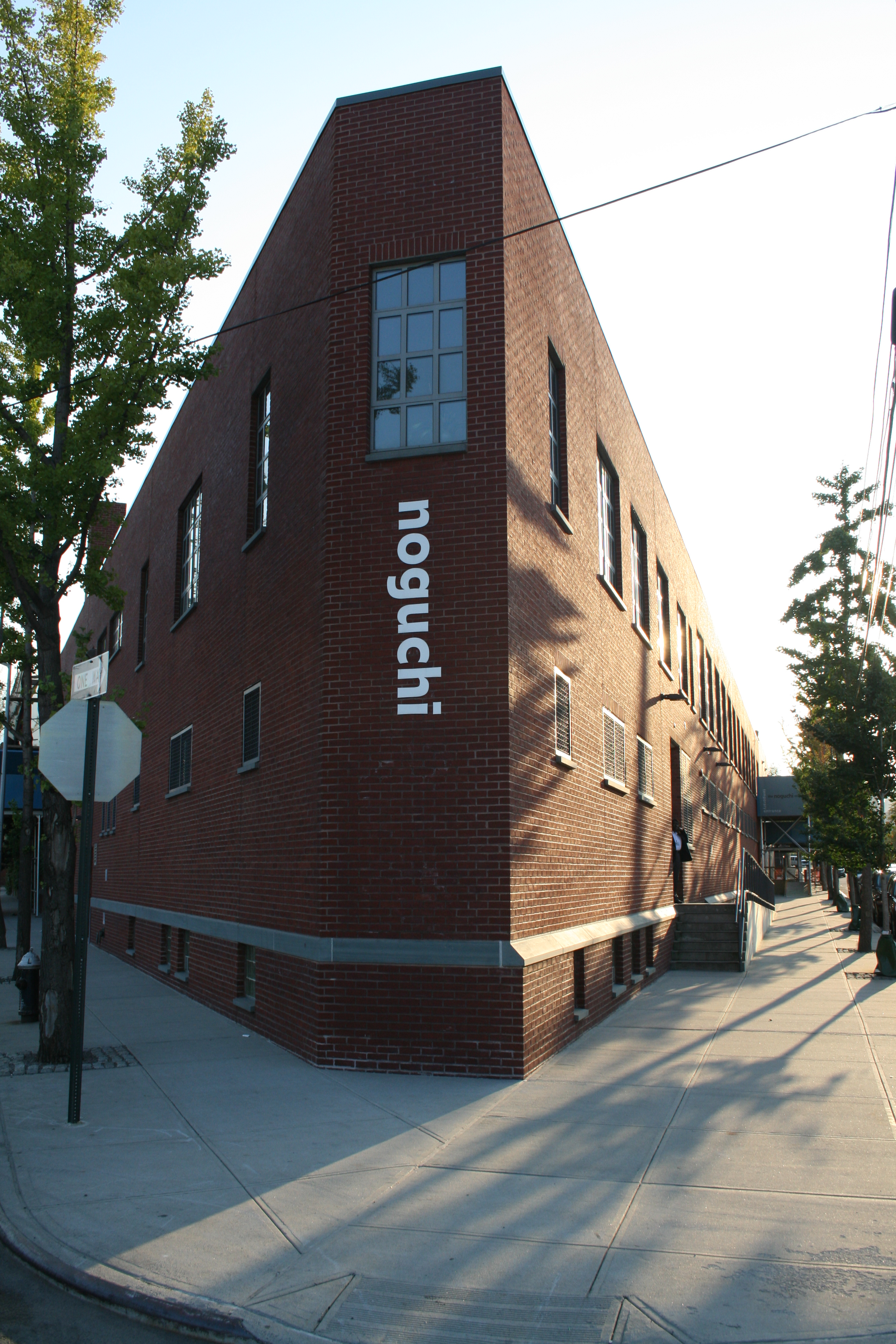
The Noguchi Museum in Long Island City, Queens

In 2011, Sam Dolnick and Kirk Semple of The New York Times wrote that few Japanese organizations in New York City have "broad-based constituencies" and those that exist tend to promote Japanese arts and assist elderly populations. They added that among the Japanese community there are "few" civic or religious leaders with prominence.

In 1901, the Japanese Methodist Church opened in New York City. In 1905, the social organization Nippon Club opened. In 1907 the Japan Society, an artistic foundation, opened. The Japan Society was an interracial organization. In 1930, the leaders of the Japanese Association sponsored the Tozei Club, an all-nisei organization. The Nippon Club was seized after the 1941 attack on Pearl Harbor and the property sold.

The Japanese American Association of New York (JAA, ニューヨーク日系人会 Nyūyōku Nikkeijin Kai) is in operation. The Consulate-General of Japan in New York City is located on the 18th Floor of 299 Park Avenue in Midtown Manhattan. The Japanese American Committee for Democracy was active during WWII.

The Noguchi Museum is located in Long Island City, Queens.

== Media ==
The Shukan NY Seikatsu (週刊NY生活), published by the New York Seikatsu Press, is a weekly Japanese-language newspaper in the New York City area. It was founded in January 2004. The paper is headquartered in Midtown Manhattan.

From 1901 to 1925, the Japanese American Commercial Weekly (日米週報, Nichi-Bei Shūhō) was published and served as the community's newspaper. The Japanese name of the paper after 1918 became the 日米時報 (Nichi-Bei Jihō).

The Japanese American (日米時報, Nichi-Bei Jihō) was published from 1924 to 1941. In 1931 the Japanese American began an English section. In 1939 the English section became its own newspaper, the Japanese American Review.

== Education ==
The Japanese Educational Institute of New York (JEI; ニューヨーク日本人教育審議会 Nyūyōku Nihonjin Kyōiku Shingi Kai), a nonprofit organization that receives funding from corporate donations and Japanese government subsidies, operates educational programs for Japanese people living in the New York City area. First established in 1975, the foundation, headquartered in Rye, operates two Japanese day schools and two weekend school systems in the New York City area.

=== Primary and secondary schools ===
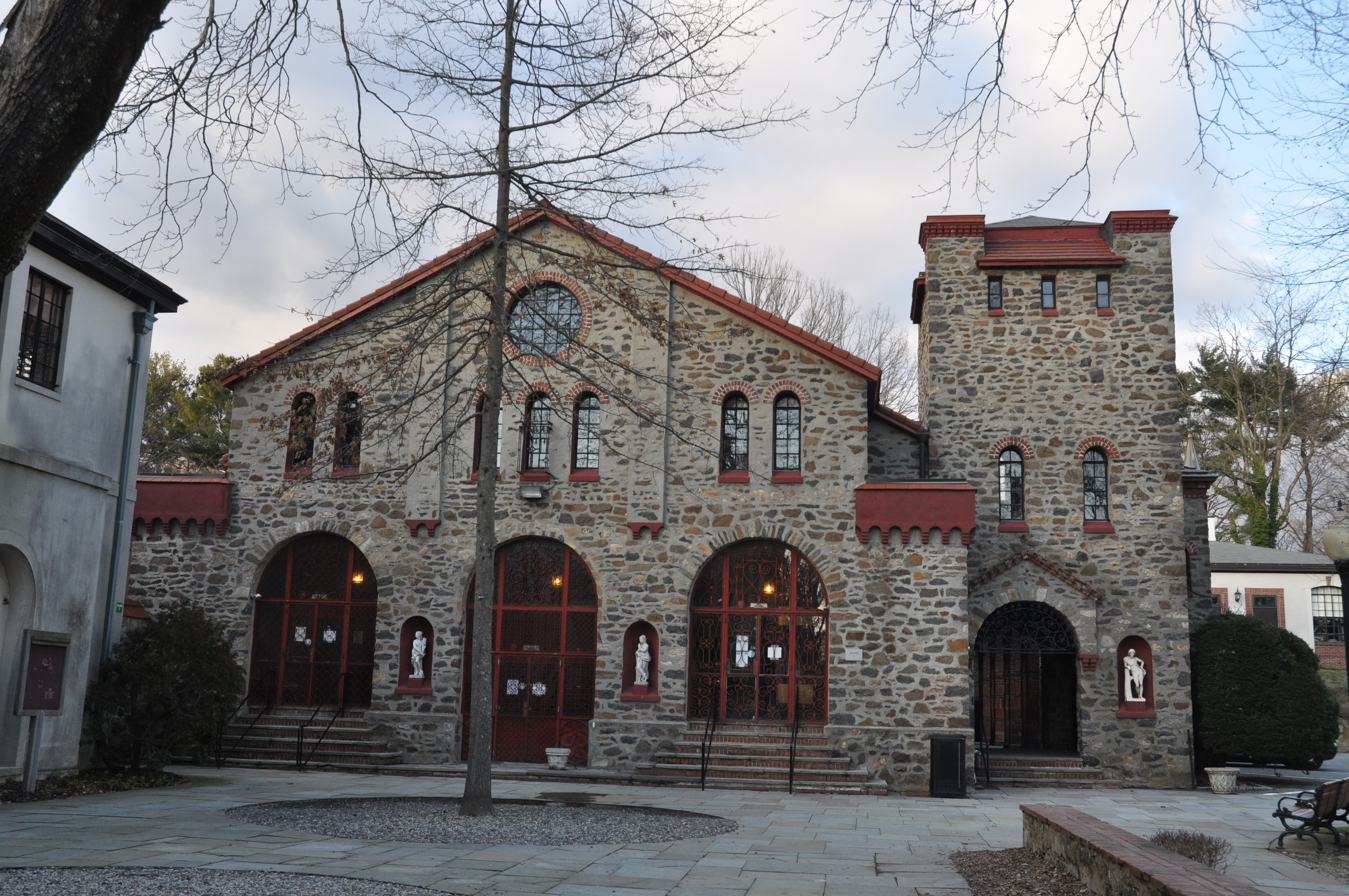
Former Japanese School of New York main building in Greenwich, Connecticut

Two Japanese international day schools serving elementary and junior high school levels, the Japanese School of New York in Greenwich, Connecticut and the New Jersey Japanese School in Oakland, New Jersey serve the Greater New York City area. Prior to 1991, the Japanese School of New York was in New York City. The New Jersey school opened in 1992 as a branch campus of the New York school and became its own school in 1999. The Keio Academy of New York, a Japanese boarding high school, is located in Harrison, New York.

In 1983, the majority of Japanese national students within Greater New York City attended U.S. schools. To have education in the Japanese language and Japanese literature, they attend the weekend classes offered by the Japanese Weekend School of New York. The parents who select the weekend school and local school combination often wish to raise their children as international and connected to foreign cultures, while parents choosing the Japanese day schools wish to raise them as typical Japanese children. As of 1988 over 30% of the New York City area parents of school age children selected the full-time NYJS instead of the weekend school and local school combination.

By 1991 Lyceum Kennedy, a French-American private school, had established a program for Japanese students.

An influx of Japanese businesspeople into Scarsdale caused the Asian population of Scarsdale High School to increase from 5% around 1986 to almost 20% in 1991. That year 19.3% of the students in the Scarsdale Public Schools were Asians, among them Japanese.

=== Miscellaneous education ===
There are three supplementary Japanese school systems in the New York City area. Two of them, the weekend schools of New York and New Jersey, are operated by the JEI.

The Japanese Weekend School of New York has its offices in New Roc City in New Rochelle, New York. As of 2006 the school had about 800 students, including Japanese citizens, and Japanese Americans, at locations in Westchester County and Long Island. The class locations include The Rufus King School (P.S.26Q) in Fresh Meadows, Queens, and Port Chester Middle School in Port Chester, New York.

The Japanese Weekend School of New Jersey (ニュージャージー補習授業校, Nyūjājī Hoshū Jugyō Kō) holds its classes at Paramus Catholic High School in Paramus, New Jersey while its offices are in Fort Lee, New Jersey. The school previously used parents as teachers, with them acting in a volunteer capacity, but by 1994 it switched to using paid teachers and collected tuition from parents, about $1,000 every four months. In the 1990s its classes were held at different campuses: C, H, J, and N. N only held elementary classes while J held only secondary classes. The first, second, and fourth campuses were in Clifton, Hackensack, and Fort Lee, respectively. By 1994, due to a decline in the Japanese economy, the weekend school was not getting as many students as it used to.

The Princeton Community Japanese Language School (PCJLS) also serves Japanese residents living in the New York City area. It is not affiliated with the JEI.

In 1987 there were five juku (cram schools) in Bergen County, New Jersey, with two of them in Fort Lee. One of the Fort Lee schools, Hinoki School, had 130 students.

== Religion ==
The Princeton Japanese Church (プリンストン日本語教会, Purinsuton Nihongo Kyōkai), catering to the Princeton, New Jersey area Japanese community, is in nearby Monmouth Junction, South Brunswick. It was established in October 1991, and in 1993 had 20-25 attendees per Sunday church worship.

== Notable individuals ==
Japanese-Americans include:

- Akiko Ichikawa, Issei artist and editor
- Takuma Kajiwara (1876–1960), Issei photographer
- Yuri Kochiyama (1921–2014), civil rights activist
- Isamu Noguchi, Nisei sculptor
- Miné Okubo (1912–2001), Nisei graphic novelist
- Sono Osato (1919–2018), Nisei entertainer
- Hikaru Utada, Nisei singer
- Michi Weglyn (1926–1999), Nisei author and civil rights activist
- Suki Terada Ports (1934-), Nisei AIDS activist

Japanese nationals and immigrants include:

- Sadakichi Hartmann (1867–1944), American art and photography critic
- Ayako Ishigaki, pen name Haru Matsui (1903–1996), activist
- Eitaro Ishigaki, among 100 Japanese artists working in NYC between World War I and World War II
- Joji, singer
- Yasuo Kuniyoshi (1889–1953), among 100 Japanese artists working in NYC between World War I and World War II
- Hideyo Noguchi (1876–1928), Japanese bacteriologist
- Yone Noguchi (1875–1947), writer and father of Isamu Noguchi
- Yoko Ono, Japanese artist, singer-songwriter, and peace activist
- Jōkichi Takamine (1854–1922), Japanese chemist
- Taro and Mitsu Yashima, among 100 Japanese artists working in NYC between World War I and World War II)

In 2011, the New American Leaders Project stated that it was not aware of any first- or second-generation Japanese immigrant in a citywide office in New York City or a statewide New York office.

== See also ==
- Asian Americans in New York City
- Bangladeshis in New York City
- Chinese people in New York City
- Demographics of New York City
- Filipinos in the New York metropolitan area
- Fuzhounese in New York City
- Indians in the New York City metropolitan region
- Koreans in New York City
- Russians in New York City
- Taiwanese people in New York City
