= New Jersey Japanese School =

The New Jersey Japanese School
- ニュージャージー日本人学校

Location
- 117 Franklin Ave, Oakland, NJ 07436; Oakland, Bergen County, New Jersey; United States; 41.02841°N 74.22650°W

Information
- Type: Primary & middle school
- Grades: 1-9
- Website: newjerseyjapaneseschool.org

The New Jersey Japanese School (ニュージャージー日本人学校, Nyūjājī Nihonjin Gakkō; NJJS) is a private school, Japanese school located in Oakland, Bergen County, New Jersey, United States, in the New York City metropolitan area. It is one of the two Japanese day schools operated by the Japanese Educational Institute of New York (JEI; ニューヨーク日本人教育審議会 Nyūyōku Nihonjin Kyōiku Shingi Kai), a nonprofit organization which also operates two Japanese weekend school systems in the New York City area.

The school's students are primarily Japanese expatriates. It has 59 students in grades 1–9 as of August 2022 with a student-teacher ratio of 4 to 1. The goal of the school is to prepare them for the Japanese educational system when the students eventually return to Japan. It occupies space rented from the Our Lady of Perpetual Help Church. As of 2009 it had 90 students.

== History ==
The Japanese School of New York established a branch campus in New Jersey on April 1, 1992, with grades one through four.

Its original enrollment was 13, but by May 1993 it had 60 students. That month, the school employed three Americans as teachers, while Japanese people had other teaching positions.

On April 1, 1999, the branch campus became its own school, The New Jersey Japanese School.

== See also ==
- Japanese in New York City
- Japanese Weekend School of New York - Japanese weekend school in the New York City area
- New York Seikatsu Press
- Japanese language education in the United States
- American School in Japan, American international school in Tokyo
