= Japanese Weekend School of New York =

Japanese supplementary school in New York, US

Coordinates: 40°54′46″N 73°46′46″W

- ニューヨーク補習授業校

Location
- 56 Harrison Street, Suite 503, New Rochelle, NY 10801

Information
- Type: Supplementary weekend Japanese school
- Established: 1962
- Website: jwsny.org/top/en/

The Japanese Weekend School of New York (JWSNY; ニューヨーク補習授業校 Nyūyōku Hoshū Jugyō Kō) is a Japanese supplementary school in the New York City metropolitan area. It has its offices in New Roc City in New Rochelle, New York. The Japanese Educational Institute of New York (JEI; ニューヨーク日本人教育審議会 Nyūyōku Nihonjin Kyōiku Shingi Kai) manages the school system, and the JWSNY is one of its two weekend school systems. The JEI also operates two Japanese day schools in the New York area.

As of 2006 the weekend school had about 800 students, including Japanese citizens and Japanese Americans, at locations in Westchester County and Long Island. The class locations include Bayside High School in Bayside, Queens, and Port Chester Middle School in Port Chester, New York.

== History ==
In 1962 several Japanese businesspersons established the weekend school with five teachers, and initially there were 36 students. Originally it only admitted children of members of the Nippon Club; enrollment increased dramatically once the school began admitting children of non-members.

As of 1988 it had over 4,000 students in levels Kindergarten through grade 12 studying in 13 locations.

As of 2011 the JEI weekend school system had 4,600 students and 216 teachers in nine elementary school programs and three secondary school programs.

== Operations ==
As of 1998 the Japanese government pays the school's cost of renting buildings for its classes and other costs, together totaling approximately 30% of the school's expenditures. The local Japanese community directly manages the school.

== Curriculum and instruction ==
Kokugo, or the Japanese language, is the main focus of the school's curriculum. The school also teaches natural sciences, mathematics, and social sciences. The goal is to have students easily adapt to the Japanese curriculum once they return to their home country.

As of 1988 there are over 200 classes for students. That year students were assigned to classes based on age and not their Japanese language abilities, so abilities of students varied within each particular class. As of 1988 the Japanese government provides textbooks free of charge to Japanese national children residing in the New York City area.

== Demographics ==
As of 2011 about 20% of the students at the weekend school, including persons who came to the U.S. at young ages and persons born in the U.S., eventually study at U.S. universities. 80% of the total number of students will return to Japan before the final year of senior high school. As of 1988 the students often had parents who were more likely to want their children to learn and adapt to the American culture and the English language compared to typical parents living in Japan, and as of that year over 30% of the New York City area parents of Japanese school age children selected the full-time New York Japanese School instead of the weekend school and local school combination. As of 1988 the regular student turnover rate at the weekend school was about 25% as many students who are children of businesspersons have to leave the New York City area prior to the end of the Japanese school year due to changes in their parents' employment statuses.

As of 1988 the school employed over 200 teachers. That year Japanese government assigned eight of them to the JWSNY; their job was to train the local teachers who directly give instruction. In 1988 the regular teacher turnover rate was also 25%.

== See also ==
- Japanese in New York City
- The Japanese School of New York (Greenwich Japanese School) - Japanese international day school in Greenwich, Connecticut, previously in New York City
- The New Jersey Japanese School - Japanese international day school in Oakland, New Jersey, previously a branch school of the New York Japanese School
- Princeton Community Japanese Language School - Another Japanese weekend school system in the New York City area
- Japanese language education in the United States
