= Rosemary Hall (Greenwich, Connecticut) =

- U.S. National Register of Historic Places
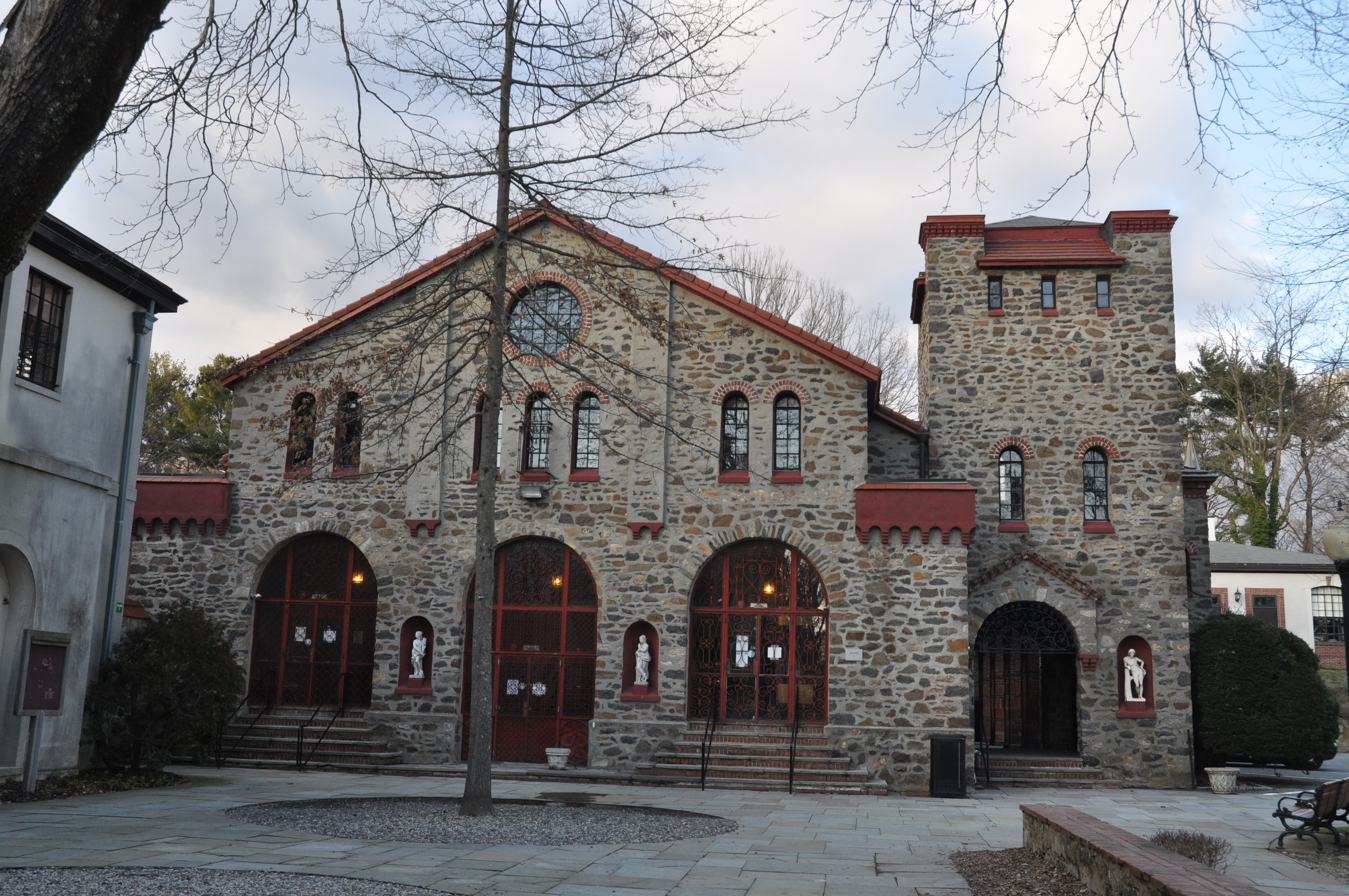

- Location within Connecticut Location within the United States
- Location: Junction of Ridgeway and Zaccheus Mead Lane, Greenwich, Connecticut
- Coordinates: 41°2′15″N 73°38′12″W
- Area: 18 acres (7.3 ha)
- Built: 1909
- Architects: Blake, Theodore E.
- Architectural style: Renaissance, Gothic Revival
- NRHP reference No.: 90001137
- Added to NRHP: August 28, 1998

Rosemary Hall was an independent girls school at Ridgeway and Zaccheus Mead Lane in Greenwich, Connecticut. It was later merged into Choate Rosemary Hall and moved to the Choate boys' school campus in Wallingford, Connecticut.

The Greenwich campus of Rosemary Hall was opened in 1900. The oldest surviving building was built in 1909. The Greenwich campus was listed on the National Register of Historic Places in 1998 for its architectural significance. The listing includes 16 contributing buildings and one other contributing structure. The historic site's listing area is 18 acres (7.3 ha).

The Brunswick School now owns the property. It plans to convert the site into a preschool and housing for employees.

== School and Foundation officers ==
- Headmistresses: Caroline Ruutz-Rees 1890–1938; Eugenia Baker Jessup '10, 1938–53, 1957–58; Helen MacKissick Williamson 1953–57; Alice McBee 1958–71; Elizabeth Winslow Loomis 1971–73.
- Presidents of Rosemary Hall Foundation: Caroline Ruutz-Rees 1890–1938 (headmistress and owner); Catherine B. Blanke '25, 1950–55; Franklin E. Parker, Jr. 1950–54 (chair); Elizabeth B. MacDonald '21, 1956–60; H. Chandler Turner, Jr. 1960–62; Julian M. Avery 1962–65; Gerrish H. Milliken 1965–74.

== History ==
=== Early years ===
Rosemary Hall was founded in 1890 by Mary Atwater Choate at Rosemary Farm in Wallingford, her girlhood home and the summer residence of Mary and her husband, William Gardner Choate. Mary, an alumna of Miss Porter's School, was the great-granddaughter of Caleb Atwater (1741–1832), a Connecticut merchant magnate who supplied the American forces during the Revolutionary War. In 1775 General George Washington visited the Atwater store in Wallingford en route to assuming command of the Continental Army. On that occasion, Washington took tea with judge Oliver Stanley at the "Red House," now Squire Stanley House on the Choate Rosemary Hall campus.

In 1878 Mary Atwater Choate had co-founded a vocational organization for Civil War widows, the New York Exchange for Women's Work, prototype of many such exchanges across the country (it survived until 2003). In 1889 Mary planned a new institution on the same principle of female self-sufficiency and she advertised in The New York Times for a headmistress to run a school that would train girls in the "domestic arts." The advertisement was answered by Caroline Ruutz-Rees, a 25-year-old Briton teaching in New Jersey.

On October 3, 1890, the New Haven Morning News reported: "The opening of Rosemary Hall took place at Wallingford yesterday ... at the beautiful Rosemary Farms, which have been the property of Mrs. Choate's family for five generations. The school occupied a house belonging to Mrs. Choate, standing near the old Atwater homestead, which the members of the school will have the privilege of visiting as often as they like. ... Rev. Edward Everett Hale addressed the school girls in his inimitable way, at once attractive and helpful. 'Never forget,' said he, 'that it is a great art to do what you do well. If you limp, limp well, and if you dance, dance well'."

This original school building, "old" Atwater House (built 1758), was at the northwest corner of Christian and Elm streets, where "new" Atwater House now stands. The eight arriving girls lived on the second floor, the headmistress's residence and classrooms occupied the ground floor, and the dining room was in the basement. More space was soon required and neighboring houses were rented from the Choates. The "old Atwater homestead" (built 1774, now known as Homestead), stands at the center of the present day Choate Rosemary Hall campus, on the northeast corner of Christian and Elm.

Caroline Ruutz-Rees (1865–1954), headmistress until 1938, was a figure of extraordinary personality and influence, a militant feminist and suffragist of national prominence. On the Wallingford golf course she wore bloomers, which shocked the locals, and on buggy rides to Wallingford station she carried a pistol. Her motto was "No rot." She held a Lady Literate in Arts from the University of St Andrews and would eventually earn a doctorate at Columbia. Ruutz-Rees (pronounced "Roots-Reese") quickly changed Rosemary Hall's mission from "domestic arts" to that of a contemporary boys school. Her personal curriculum for the next four decades had three core components: student self-government, contact sports, and a brutal workload of academics.

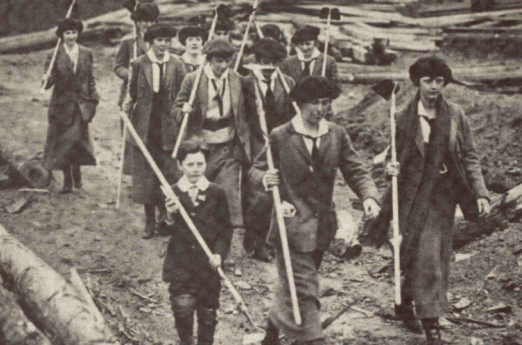
Rosemary Hall students go to work on Community War Garden potato fields, 1918

Ruutz-Rees taught the classical languages, history, and French. In 1897 she was the first headmistress of an American girls' school to prescribe uniform dress, and over time the Rosemarian uniform became increasingly elaborate, with cape, star-shaped berets, and much seasonal and occasional variety. Equally elaborate was Rosemarian ritual and tradition, most of it invented by Ruutz-Rees. Her faculty followed the British practice of wearing academic robes in class and addressing students by their last names. Ruutz-Rees herself always wore azure silk dresses and a necklace of amber beads.

In 1896 the Choate School was founded in Wallingford by Mary Choate and her husband William. He was U.S. District Judge for the Southern Circuit of New York from 1878 to 1881, and afterward a partner of Shipman, Barlow, Laroque, and Choate in New York City. There was no formal relationship between the Choates' new boys school and their other foundation, Rosemary Hall, a hundred yards to the east on Christian Street in Wallingford, but there were coeducational audiences for plays and recitals and Mary Choate hosted dances at the Homestead, an Atwater family residence since 1774.

The official history of Choate Rosemary Hall, written by Tom Generous, says that the rift between Caroline Ruutz-Rees and Mary Choate, proponents of two very different sorts of feminism, was public knowledge as early as 1896, in which year headmistress and founder did not share the lectern at Prize Day and local newspapers published "denials" of a rumor that Ruutz-Rees would leave the school. But by 1900 the headmistress and her educational style had acquired influential champions among the students' parents and two of them, residents of Greenwich, Connecticut, a wealthy enclave twenty-five miles from midtown Manhattan, joined forces to effect the removal of the school to their town.

Shipping magnate Nathaniel Witherell donated 5 acres (20,000 m^{2}) of land in the Rock Ridge section of Greenwich. Julian Curtiss gathered a group of investors and established a joint stock corporation funded through the sale of six-percent bonds. Ruutz-Rees was the chief shareholder. The Greenwich residence of Rosemary Hall began in fall term 1900, when 57 girl students moved into the Main Building, known as "The School," a U-shaped shingled house on Zaccheus Mead Lane. Other facilities on the property were a wood-frame building that would be the gym for many years, a tennis court, and a running track. In the next two decades the campus would build or acquire other "cottages" and lay out an Italian garden, the gift in 1912 of Janet Ruutz-Rees, mother of the headmistress.

The heart of the campus was St. Bede's Chapel, built with $15,000 collected at bake sales, teas, and benefits, and from every constituency of the school. Construction began in 1906 and consecration was performed October 18, 1909, by the Episcopal bishop of Connecticut, Chauncey Bunce Brewster. St. Bede's was Middle English Gothic, with granite walls, unnailed slate roof, hand-hewn timbers, Welsh red tile floor, and a 16-foot (4.9 m) altar window of handmade English glass, designed by Christopher Whall. According to the November 25, 1909 issue of Leslie's Weekly," it was "begun three years ago by the girls themselves who collected stones and carried them one by one to the spot which the building was to occupy." From 1915 to 1965 the handwritten name of every graduate was painted in gold on the ceiling. On October 17, 2009, the centennial of St. Bede's was celebrated in Greenwich by Rosemarians past and present, with the Whimawehs singing traditional RH songs.

=== Building post-merger history ===
The building property later became the Daycroft School. The campus previously was about 24.5 acres (9.9 ha) large, but in 1984 the school sold 7.5 acres (3.0 ha) of land for $1,100,000, and so the size of the campus was down to 17 acres (6.9 ha); the sale reduced the ratio of land to building space, and so the school administration unknowingly caused the facility to go against the zoning regulations of the Town of Greenwich. Daycroft asked for a variance to exempt the institution from needing to raze buildings and/or purchase additional land. The variance was not given to the institution, but the Greenwich town government never enforced the requirements of the zoning up to the time Daycroft was disestablished.

In 1989 Daycroft sold it to the Japanese Educational Institute of New York (JEI; ニューヨーク日本人教育審議会 Nyūyōku Nihonjin Kyōiku Shingi Kai), and in 1992 the campus began housing the Japanese School of New York (Greenwich Japanese School). Because Daycroft had unknowingly violated town code by selling land and having too high of a building/land ratio, the Japanese school faced a possibility of demolishing historic buildings, but ultimately did not do so after an agreement with the town government was made.

In 2006 the JEI sold the building to the Westchester Fairfield Hebrew Academy (later Carmel Academy), and so both schools shared the site. In 2020 Carmel closed its school operations. Brunswick School planned to convert the site into a preschool and housing for employees. The Japanese School had moved into another facility in Greenwich. Brunswick acquired the former Carmel Academy site in September 2023.

=== Timeline ===
- 1889: Mary Atwater Choate advertises in New York for a headmistress.
- 1890: Foundation of the school by M.A. Choate; Caroline Ruutz-Rees begins 48 years as headmistress; 8 girls enroll. October 2, opening ceremonies held.
- 1891: First election of Optima, or best girl; the honor was bestowed until 1977.
- 1892: First publication of The Question Mark, a literary magazine, one of the earliest of its type in an American girls school.
- 1893: Spring term, first Shakespeare play performed. Rosemary Hall hosts Mrs. Hazen's School of Pelham Manor, N.Y., in what is regarded as the first interscholastic sports event between girls schools in American history.
- 1894: First interscholastic basketball game played against New Haven Normal School.

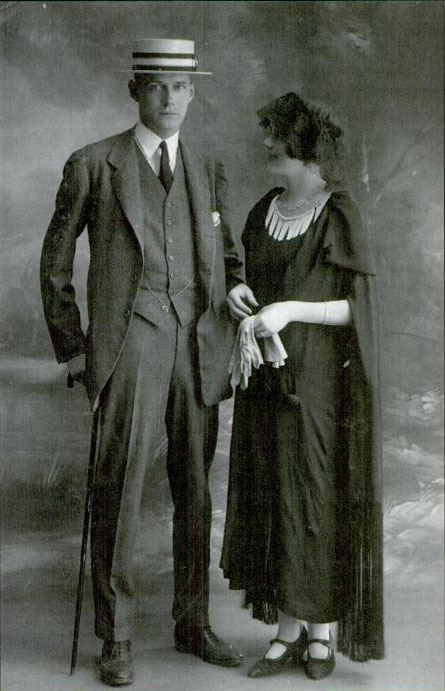
Caresse Crosby '11, with her husband Harry Crosby. Poet, publisher, and "literary godmother to the Lost Generation" – Time magazine

- 1895: In May, first Sixth Form Walk, about 45 miles (72 km) in three days, the route being Wallingford, Durham, Middletown, Southington, Wallingford.
- 1896: 20 girls. Frederick Hulseberg is hired to coach the cricket team, thereby becoming the first girls cricket coach in America.
- 1897: First election of The Committee, the student self-governance body; it lasted until 1971.
- 1898: Sixth formers required to pass the Bryn Mawr College entrance exam in order to graduate; the requirement lasted 39 years.
- 1900: School relocates to Greenwich. 57 girls.
- 1907: Cambridge-educated Mary Elizabeth Lowndes begins 31 years as teacher and, from 1910, co-headmistress.
- 1908: First publication of The Answer Book, the yearbook; its title was suggested by The Question Mark; it merged with The Brief in 1973.
- 1909: October 18, consecration of St. Bede's Chapel.
- 1910: Fall term, Lady Baden-Powell, wife of the Boy Scouts founder, awards Caresse Crosby '11 the eagle and the amulet, thereby making her the (unofficial) first American Girl Scout.
- 1911: Caresse Crosby graduates. Kindly Club founded by Janet Ruutz-Rees, mother of the headmistress, "to spread the spirit of kindliness throughout the school," and perform intramural and extramural charity.
- 1918: Spring term, first Garden Party; the event has lasted to the present.
- 1919: Carrington House is bought.
- 1923: November 11, the Main Building burns to the ground and all school records are destroyed.
- 1924: The Main Building is rebuilt. The school sells 30-year, six-percent bonds. 200 girls enroll, including 56 boarders.
- 1927: 208 girls.
- 1928: Nation's best field hockey varsity begins three-year unbeaten streak.
- 1931: 130 girls.
- 1935: 91 girls.
- 1937: March, Life magazine has four-page photo essay on The Mid, the annual February dance: "fifth and sixth form girls invited 76 boys from such places as Yale, Princeton, Harvard and Exeter."
- 1938: Ruutz-Rees and Lowndes retire as co-headmistresses, but remain active in the school administration. Eugenia Baker Jessup '10, a Bryn Mawr alumna, begins 15 years as headmistress.
- 1947: November, first issue of The Rosemary Alumnae Newsletter is published.
- 1948: Group that includes Board members and the headmistress acquires an option to buy the school.

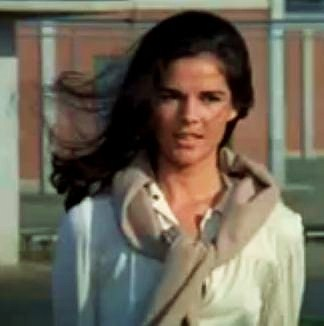
Ali MacGraw '55, Golden Globe-winning, and Oscar- and BAFTA-nominated actress

- 1950: 81 girls. April 18, the school is incorporated as Rosemary Hall Foundation, with Catherine B. Blanke '25 as president and Franklin E. Parker, Jr. as chair. Spring term, the headmistress institutes "Operation X" in which 10 selected sixth formers are exempted from most school rules; the experiment is reported by Newsweek in an article on the school in May.
- 1951: 110 girls.
- 1953: Fall term, Helen MacKissick Williamson begins four years as headmistress.
- 1954: 161 girls. Headmistress emeritus Ruutz-Rees dies.
- 1955: December, headmistress Williamson resigns after pressure from conservative block led by gamesmistress Hester Macquire, but 13 of the 14-member faculty support Williamson and the Board retains her.
- 1957: June, headmistress Williamson dies aged 53. Summer, Alice McBee of Concord Academy is chosen as headmistress, but her arrival is delayed a year until her Concord contract ends. Eugenia Baker Jessup returns as headmistress during the interim year.
- 1958: Alice McBee, a bachelor alumna of both Sweetbriar and Columbia, begins 13 years as headmistress. Whimawehs a cappella group begins.
- 1959: 208 girls.
- 1962: Ruutz-Rees Auditorium opens, with seating for 300.
- 1963: 250 girls. Jessup House dormitory is built.
- 1965: Glenn Close graduates.
- 1966: Spring term, dean of students Elizabeth Loomis and several faculty members resign in protest against headmistress McBee's longtime refusal to admit African-American students; McBee relents and in fall term the first black student enrolls.
- 1967: Fall term, headmistress McBee urges the trustees to consider "official affiliation" with a boys school, in light of declining enrollment and financial difficulty. Dedication of Arts and Sciences Building.

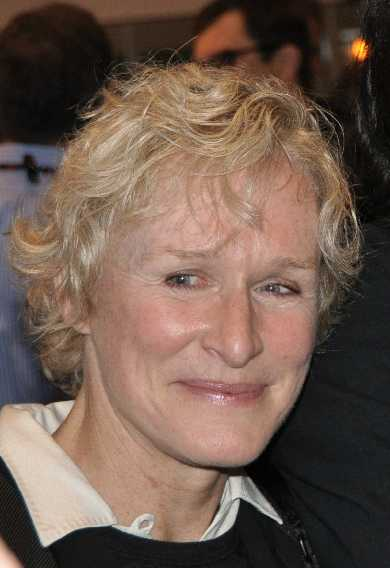
Glenn Close '65, Emmy, Golden Globe, Obie, and four-time Tony Award-winning actress

- 1968: January 8 in Wallingford, Choate School headmaster Seymour St. John hosts a private meeting with Rosemary Hall Board chair Charles Stetson, and the feasibility of relocating RH is discussed. January 26, Choate trustees vote to allow continuing discussions with RH. June, the CS and RH boards make a formal agreement, with the understanding that RH would relocate. September 24, St. John and McBee hold a press conference in St. John Hall and issue a press release dated September 26 which states that "a brand new school would be built for Rosemary Hall on Choate Land, and the combined institutions would provide 'coordinate' secondary education starting in September 1971." Amidst concern that RH would lose its identity, actress Ali MacGraw '56 offers a major gift toward moving St. Bede's Chapel to Wallingford, but there is insufficient response.
- 1969: January, architect James Polshek is selected to design the Wallingford RH campus; his budget will eventually be $6.4 million. On Prize Day, Choate headmaster St. John is the graduation speaker in Greenwich.
- 1970: Spring term, 20 RH sixth formers have an advance guard residence on the CS campus; they live in Nichols House; Meg Colgate '70 is made interim editor of The Choate News.
- 1970: 258 girls.
- 1971: Elizabeth Winslow Loomis begins two years as headmistress; she had been head of upper school at The Lenox School (now Birch Wathen Lenox School) in Manhattan and a former RH teacher and dean. June 3, the last Prize Day in Greenwich, Seymour St. John is the graduation speaker. The Greenwich campus is bought by Daycroft School, which moves from its own Greenwich campus on Rock Ridge Road. August, the last two Wallingford campus buildings, Bronfman Library and Macquire Gymnasium, are completed. In September the school and 223 girls relocate to Wallingford.

== Notable alumni ==
- Neile Adams (1932–), actress, singer, and dancer
- Florieda Batson (1900–1996), hurdler, 1922 Olympian
- Glenn Close (1947–), eight-time Oscar-nominated actress
- Caresse Crosby (1892–1970), socialite, poet, founder of Black Sun Press, and inventor of the bra
- Claire Giannini Hoffman (1904–1997), first woman to serve on the boards of Bank of America and Sears, Roebuck & Company
- Mary Crane Hone (1904–1990), actress, antiwar activist, and historical preservationist
- Sarah Kernochan (1947–), novelist, screenwriter, songwriter, and two-time Oscar-winning director
- Ali MacGraw (1939–), actress and haute couture model
- Terry O'Neill (1953–), feminist, lawyer, professor, and president of the National Organization for Women (NOW)
- Dorothy Schurman Hawes (1905–1977), American writer on China
- Anne Ramsey (1929–1988), Academy Award nominated and Golden Globe nominated actress

== See also ==
- National Register of Historic Places listings in Greenwich, Connecticut
