= Japanese School of New York =

- ニューヨーク日本人学校

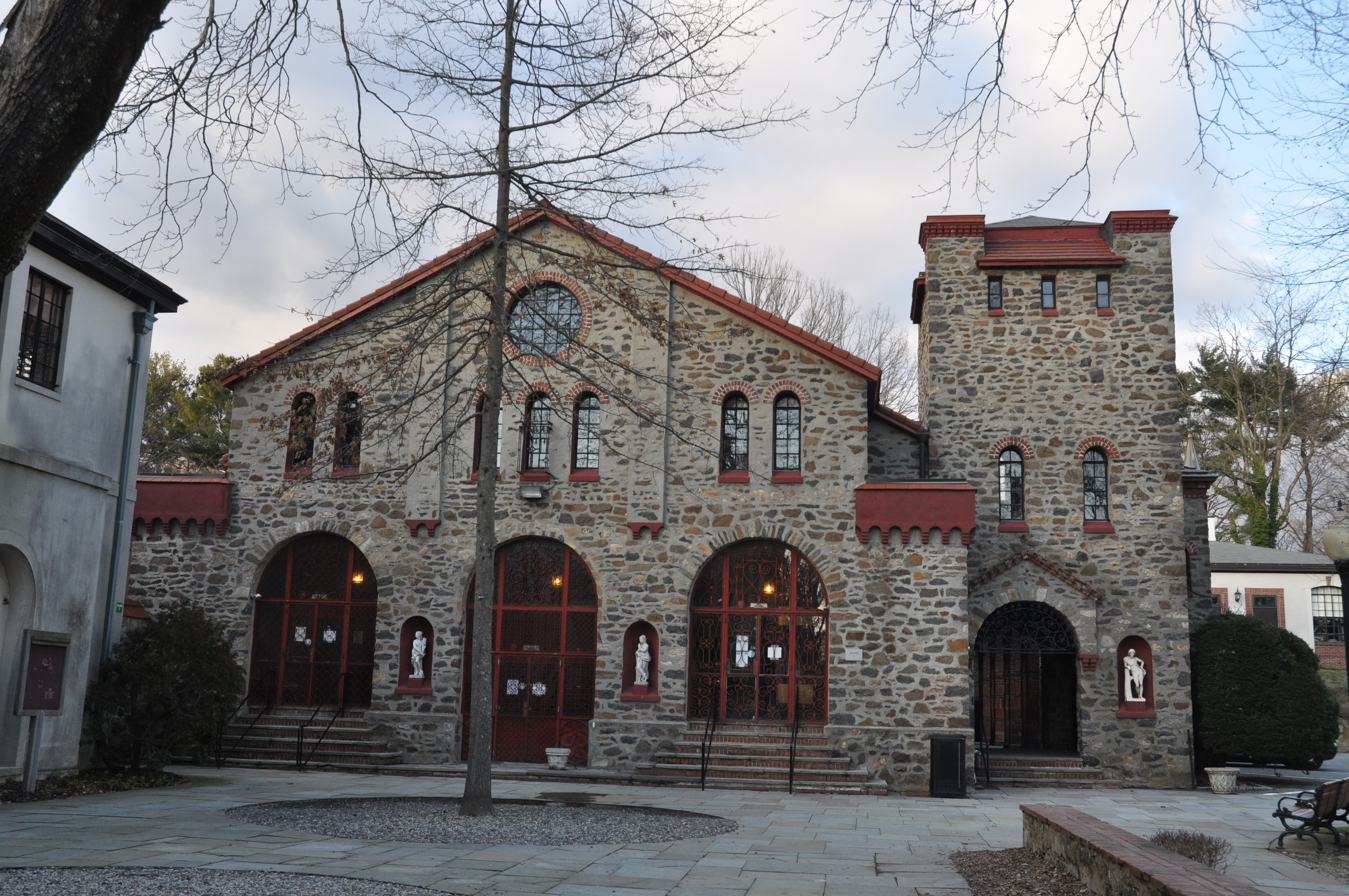
- Main building of the former campus

Location
- 6 Riverside Avenue, Riverside, CT 06878 U.S.A; Greenwich, Connecticut; United States; 41.040761°N 73.586955°W

Information
- Other name: The Greenwich Japanese School
- Type: Primary and middle school
- Grades: 1-9
- Enrollment: 240 (2005)
- Website: www.gwjs.org

The Japanese School of New York (ニューヨーク日本人学校, Nyūyōku Nihonjin Gakkō), also known as The Greenwich Japanese School (GJS), is a Japanese elementary and junior high school, located in Riverside, Greenwich, Connecticut, near New York City.

As of 1992 the Ministry of Education of Japan funds the school, which is one of the two Japanese day schools of the Japanese Educational Institute of New York (JEI; ニューヨーク日本人教育審議会 Nyūyōku Nihonjin Kyōiku Shingi Kai), a nonprofit organization which also operates two Japanese weekend schools in the New York City area. Before 1991 the Japanese School of New York was located in Queens, New York City, and for one year it was located in Yonkers, New York.

== History ==
On April 25, 1975, a group of Japanese parents, under the Japanese Educational Institute of New York, founded the school. The school, which opened on September 2, 1975 in Queens, New York City, was New York City's first Japanese language day school. The school was established because several Japanese parents were concerned with their children's education in the U.S., and all parties at the school emphasized re-integration into the Japanese educational system when the students return to their home countries.

Due to an increasing student population, the school moved to a new location in Queens in December 1980. On August 18, 1991, the school moved to Yonkers in Westchester County, New York. The school used the ex-Walt Whitman Junior High School on a temporary basis until the Greenwich facility was ready. In exchange, the JEI paid for renovations of the building.

After one year in Yonkers, the school moved to Connecticut. On September 1, 1992, classes began at its first location in Greenwich. The Greenwich property was the former Daycroft School, acquired by the JEI in 1989. The JEI had paid $9,800,000 to purchase it. The JEI decided to preserve the historic buildings. Groups of area residents had initially opposed the relocation of the Japanese school, and there were disputes over the motivations of the groups. Because Daycroft had unknowingly violated town code by selling land and having too high of a building/land ratio, the Japanese school faced a possibility of demolishing historic buildings, but ultimately did not do so after an agreement with the town government was made.

Grades 1 through 3 were added in 1996, allowing the school to have a continuous grades 1-9 education program. Since the move, the school had been called the "Greenwich Japanese School" in English, while among the Japanese, it is still known as "The Japanese School of New York". In 1994, the administrators had plans to admit American students. That year, the school had 420 students. As of 1994 80% of those students were on temporary stays in the United States of five or fewer years. As of that year, the ratio of boys to girls was almost 3 to 1.

On April 1, 1992, the school opened a branch campus in New Jersey with grades 1 through to 4. On April 1, 1999, the New Jersey campus became its own institution, the New Jersey Japanese School.

By 2002, due to a decrease of Japanese families in Westchester County, the school's population decreased. The school had concerns about remaining financially solvent due to fewer tuition dollars collected.

In 2010 the school celebrated its 35th anniversary.

In 2022 the school moved to its current location in Riverside. The Carmel Academy, which owned the previous Greenwich site, had closed its school facility, and the Brunswick School, which was scheduled to be the new owner, planned to convert the former Greenwich site into housing for employees.

== Campus ==
The current campus is located in the Riverside census-designated place, in Greenwich, Connecticut. It was previously used as the Father Vincent J. O'Connor Center, of the St. Catherine of Siena Church.

The previous Greenwich campus was in the Greenwich census-designated place. This campus, the former Rosemary Hall school for girls, had 18 acres (7.3 ha) of space and over 15 buildings. The campus, situated along Lake Avenue, shared its facilities with the Carmel Academy (formerly the Westchester Fairfield Hebrew Academy). The campus includes the St. Bedes Chapel.

Originally it was located at 187-90 Grand Central Parkway. in Jamaica Estates, Queens, near Jamaica. On December 22, 1980, The first location was the former Parkway School Building, purchased by the Japanese school.

It moved to 196-25 Peck Avenue in Fresh Meadows, Queens, near Flushing. The second Queens location was the former P.S. 179, which the school leased from the New York City Board of Education. Rick Lyman of the Philadelphia Inquirer said in 1988 that the red brick building had been covered in graffiti. The school moved to Yonkers on August 18, 1991, and to Greenwich on September 1, 1992.

By the 2000s, several buildings in the Greenwich campus were vacant due to the decreased student population. In 2006 the Westchester Fairfield Hebrew Academy (which later became Carmel Academy) purchased the Rosemary Hall campus from the Japanese Education Alliance for $20 million, and classes for that school began there in September 2006. The Japanese school classes remained on the Rosemary Hall campus; the Hebrew school leased several buildings on the campus to the Japanese school for up to eight years. The classes of each school are held in separate buildings, while both schools share the fieldstone gymnasium.

In 2005 an arson incident occurred on the school campus. An office building was destroyed as a result of the arson. The building had a kitchen and two offices on the first floor, and a one bedroom apartment, which was not occupied at the time of the fire, on the second floor. The Japanese Educational Institute of New York occupied the building.

== Curriculum ==
The school uses the Japanese educational system curriculum. As of 1983, aspects of the Japanese curriculum offered at the school included art, English, Japanese, music, physical education, and social studies. In addition to the Japanese curriculum, students also take American social studies and extra English lessons. In 2021, the school continued having a similar curriculum with both English and Japanese classes.

The total amount of English instruction per week per student, as of 1988, was five hours per week, while each student took one hour of American social studies instruction per week. The school does not have electives. As of 1987 it offered a "morals" class which teaches children how to work in groups and following the mores of Japanese society. As of 2002, with the exception of English, all classes were taught in the Japanese language.

In 1987 Torao Endo, the principal, said that in this school students are encouraged to volunteer their own answers to questions and to directly say what they think, in keeping with American culture; Endo said that such behaviors are discouraged in Japanese schools.

In 1986 the school had 16 American teachers; these teachers give English and American social studies classes. As of 1986 the school arranges one day exchanges with local American schools so that the students attending The Japanese School of New York do not become too isolated from the United States.

As of 1988 the school was certified by the New York state government, so graduates are eligible to attend American high schools.

== Student body ==
As of 1983 the students attending the school tended to be the children of bankers, businesspeople, and diplomats. As of 2021 most students were in the United States due to parents being sojourners due to employment reasons.

As of 1988 over 30% of parents of Japanese mandatory school age children in the New York City area sent their children to the Japanese day school instead of using a combination of the local American schools and the Japanese Weekend School of New York; parents who chose to send their children to the JSNY wanted to raise them as mainstream Japanese people as opposed to being more influenced by foreign cultures. As of the 1980s, students who graduated from the school typically went back to Japan to enter high schools and universities in Japan. Since parents placed greater expectations on male children to do well on examinations, compared to girls, more boys are enrolled at the school than girls. Japanese society had the concept that boys would take jobs in large, stable companies, and that girls would become educated, but would primarily become housewives. In 2021, most students returned to Japan for high school.

When the school was first established, most of the students lived in Queens, and some commuted from New Jersey and Westchester County. As of 1983 students came from New York City and from suburbs of New York City. In 1983 the school had 325 boys and 125 girls. In 1986 students came from all five New York City boroughs, Long Island, New Jersey, and Westchester County. In 2002 about 75% of its students consisted of families living in Westchester County, New York.

In 1975 the school had 152 students and covered grades four through six. In 1983 the school had 450 students. In 1986 it had 482 students. In 1987 it had about 460 students, and covered grades five through nine. As of 1988 the school enrollment was capped, with 560 students being the highest allowable number. In 1992 the school had 417 students. In 2001 it had 314 students. In 2002 it had 253 students. The enrollment declined because of a decreasing Japanese corporate presence in the New York City area due to the stagnation of the Japanese economy. In 2005 it had 240 students in grades one through nine.

== Student discipline ==
In 1983 Suzanne Paluszek, an American national who taught English at the school, said that students at the school were better behaved than students at American schools.

As of 1987 the school does not have a dress code, in keeping with the practices of most American schools.

== Tuition and funding ==
As of 1988 tuition and other private sector sources funded about 40% of the school's expenditures while the Japanese public sector provided the remaining 60%.

In 1983 the tuition was $300 ($969.76 according to inflation) per month, and bus transportation was included. In 1987 the tuition ranged from $1,910 ($5412.79 when adjusted for inflation) to $2,280 ($7991.65 when adjusted for inflation) per year. In 1994 for elementary students the yearly tuition was $3,384 ($7350.74 adjusted for inflation) while for junior high students it was $3,816 ($8289.13 adjusted for inflation). In 2002 the tuition was $7,000 ($12530.06 adjusted for inflation) per year per student.

== Weekend schools ==
As of 2010 about 1,300 students of Greenwich Public Schools attend Saturday classes at the Japanese School of New York. In 1983 the school held weekend schools in several locations. Most classes are held in public school facilities, and as of 1983 classes operate for two hour periods on Saturdays. In 1983 the majority of Japanese national students within Greater New York City attended U.S. schools. To have education in the Japanese language and Japanese literature, they attend the weekend classes offered by the Japanese School of New York.

== Extra-curricular activities ==
As of 1986 the school holds an annual fair. When it moved to a new location in Queens in 1980, it held a fair to introduce Japanese culture to Americans living in the area. The fair was so popular that the school continued holding it.

== See also ==
- Japanese in New York City
- Japanese Weekend School of New York - Japanese weekend school in the New York City area
- New York Seikatsu Press
- Japanese language education in the United States
- American School in Japan, American international school in Tokyo
