= Daycroft School =

Private boarding school

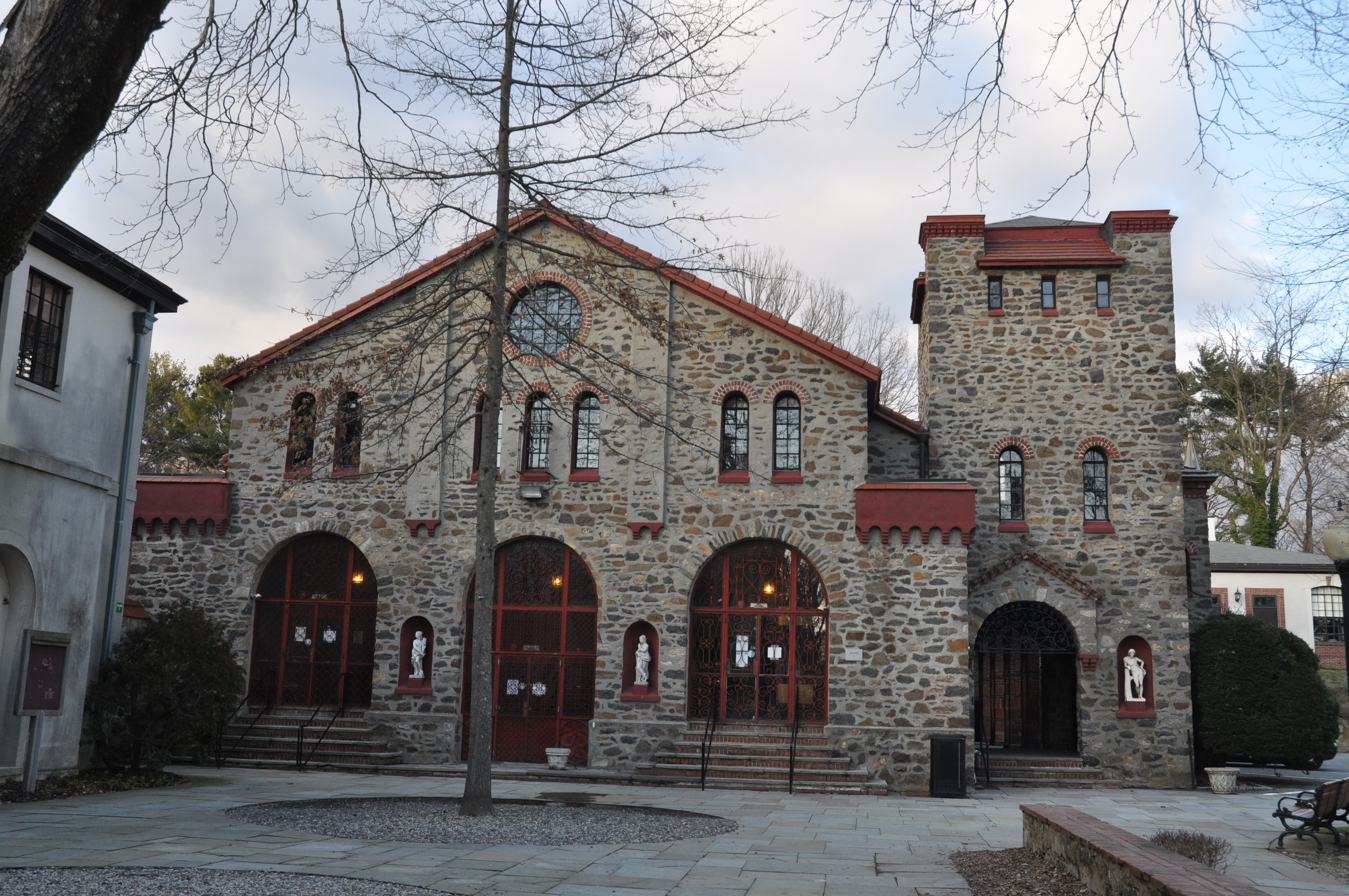
- Rosemary Hall, the campus from 1971 to 1991

Location
- Greenwich, Connecticut 06831; United States; 41°2′15″N 73°38′12″W

Information
- Type: University-preparatory school
- Motto: Perceive then demonstrate
- Established: 1928
- Founder: Sarah Pyle Smart
- Status: Closed
- Closed: 1991
- Mascot: Tigers
- Website: daycroftschool.org

The Daycroft School was a co-educational private boarding school founded in 1928. Initially located at a private home in Darien, Connecticut, it relocated to Stamford in 1935, and in 1963, to the neighboring town of Greenwich, Connecticut. Relocating again in Greenwich, it eventually occupied the Rosemary Hall campus from 1971 until Daycroft's closing in 1991. Smart founded the school for the children of local Christian Scientists.

== History ==
Daycroft was founded by Sarah Pyle Smart as a private school for the children of area Christian Scientists so they could be educated in an environment akin to their home life, where the teachings of Christian Science were "an integral part" of life. To that end, the faculty were all members of The Mother Church. Admission to the school was restricted to the children of parents who were students of Christian Science. The school had no official tie with the Christian Science Church. In later years, admission was extended to those had a close relative who was a member of The Mother Church or one of its branch churches.

The school was a member of the Secondary Education Board and offered pre-school through high school, in general subjects and college preparatory education. The school offered partial scholarships and was incorporated in 1939 as a non-profit institution. Daycroft served both day students and boarding students at its Greenwich campus. It contained a boys and girls dormitory. Dorm parents were selected to live on each floor of the dorms annually both to live there as a resource for the students and to help maintain safety for the students.

The school's initial home was in Darien, Connecticut, where the Smarts lived. In 1935, a portion of an estate was purchased on Noroton Hill, near the Stamford Cove and became the new home for the school. The 46-acre Stamford campus was sold to Clairol in 1963, when the school moved to the Rock Ridge area of Greenwich, Connecticut. In 1971, the school moved to the former Rosemary Hall campus, also in Rock Ridge. In 1998, the campus was placed on the National Register of Historic Places because of its architectural significance. Its chapel was designed in the Middle English Gothic style by Theodore E. Blake of Carrère & Hastings.

In 1972, the Daycroft school was one of the last sites of a polio outbreak in the United States. Due to their Christian Science belief, very few students at the school were immunized for polio. The outbreak prompted an emergency quarantine and mass immunization, which successfully prevented polio from spreading to the rest of the state. Ultimately, at least 11 school children (9 boys and 2 girls) were stricken by the paralytic form of the disease.

The highest ever number of students at Daycroft was 150. The campus previously was about 24.5 acres (9.9 ha) large, but in 1984 the school sold 7.5 acres (3.0 ha) of land for $1,100,000, and so the size of the campus was down to 17 acres (6.9 ha); the sale reduced the ratio of land to building space, and so the school administration unknowingly caused the facility to go against the zoning regulations of the Town of Greenwich. Daycroft asked for a variance to exempt the institution from needing to raze buildings and/or purchase additional land. The variance was not given to the institution, but the Greenwich town government never enforced the requirements of the zoning up to the time Daycroft was disestablished.

In 1989 the school had 58 students. That year, Daycroft sold the campus to the Japanese Educational Institute of New York (JEI; ニューヨーク日本人教育審議会 Nyūyōku Nihonjin Kyōiku Shingi Kai). In June 1991 Daycroft's final graduation had 11 students graduating. In 1992 the campus began housing the Japanese School of New York (Greenwich Japanese School).

== Notable alumni and staff ==
- Richard Bergenheim
- Jacqueline Moss
- Zack Snyder
