= Carmel Academy =

Jewish private school in Connecticut, US

Coordinates: 41.0385°N 73.6352°W

Carmel Academy (formerly the Westchester Fairfield Hebrew Academy, WFHA) was a Jewish private school in Greenwich, Connecticut, serving grades Kindergarten through 8. Also including transitional Kindergarten The school originally was located in Port Chester, New York.

In 2020, Carmel Academy announced its plans to close at the end of the school year.

== History ==
The school opened in a rented space in Port Chester, New York, in 1998. The school was established by parents who were unable to send their children to the Solomon Schechter School of Westchester (now the Leffell School) in White Plains, New York, as that school was oversubscribed. The parents wanted the teaching of Torah to go by themes instead of being taught chronologically, and it wanted the school to mix its instruction of world history with Jewish history. The school had 24 students when it opened.

The school has been located in Greenwich since 2001. Originally, the school occupied areas within Temple Sholom, the largest synagogue in Greenwich. The school's physical education program consisted of weekly visits to the YMCA and basketball, played with a basketball hoop in the parking lot of the temple. In 2005 it had 108 students. In 2006 it had 130 students.

In the 2000s, The Japanese School of New York (Greenwich Japanese School) had vacant buildings due to their decreased student population. In 2006, the Westchester Fairfield Hebrew Academy purchased The Japanese School of New York's 15 Ridgeway campus from the Japanese Education Alliance for $20 million, and classes began there in September 2006. The Japanese School continued to the campus for classes. The Hebrew school leased several buildings on the campus to the Japanese school for up to eight years.

In 2006, Carmel school administrators decided to place a maximum enrolment of 325 students, with a maximum of two classes with 18 students each per grade, so that the school's students receive individual attention from teachers. As of 2009, the school has about 230 students.

The school received its final name in 2011.

In 2020, Carmel Academy announced that it would close down at the end of the school year. A letter from Carmel referred students to the Leffell School, stating that there would be integration of Carmel programs there, although Leffell stated that Carmel was simply closing and that it was not merging into Lefell. Leffell was to take many of the students at Carmel.

The Brunswick School, which was scheduled to acquire the Carmel Academy site, planned to convert it into a preschool and housing for employees. The Japanese School moved into another facility in Greenwich. Brunswick acquired the former Carmel Academy site in September 2023.

== Campus ==
The campus, the former Rosemary Hall school for girls, had 16 acres (6.5 ha) of space and 15 buildings. The classes of the Hebrew school and the Japanese school were held in separate buildings, while both schools shared the fieldstone gymnasium. The school was the only Jewish educational institution in the world to house a Christian chapel, St. Bede's Chapel. The chapel, which was designed by Carrere and Hastings, was completed in 1909.

== Curriculum ==
The school had Judaic studies, language arts, mathematics, and science. The curriculum included the history of the Jewish people, the Hebrew language, and information about Israel. The Hebrew language program taught the language as a modern language, and students used literature, newspapers, poems, and songs to learn the language.

The school also offered the Providing Alternative Learning Strategies program to teach students with language-based learning disabilities.

== Extra-curricular activities ==
Extra-curricular activities included a student newspaper, Chidon HaTanach Bible Contest, E2K, student government, and the Math Olympiad.

In 2003 Carmel Academy had an exchange program with the Jaim Weitzman School in Buenos Aires, Argentina.
