= Hagar Chemali =

American political writer (born 1981)

- Born: Hagar Hadi Hajjar; September 4, 1981 (age 44); Greenwich, Connecticut, U.S.
- Education: Barnard College (BS); Columbia University (MS)
- Occupations: Political satirist; Foreign policy analyst; Television personality
- Years active: 2005 – Present
- Spouse: Julien Chemali (m. 2010)
- Children: 3

Hagar Hajjar Chemali (born Hagar Hadi Hajjar; September 4, 1981) is an American political satirist, writer, producer, television personality, and political commentator. Chemali has held senior national security and public affairs positions under the Barack Obama and George W. Bush administrations. She comments and writes on national security and foreign policy.

== Early life and education ==
Chemali was born in Greenwich, Connecticut, to Hadi and Mirella (née Joakim) Hajjar. Chemali's great-granduncle was the first president of Lebanon, Bechara el-Khoury.

Chemali studied Political Science at Barnard College, earning her bachelor's degree in 2003. She attended Columbia University's School of International and Public Affairs where she concentrated on International Security Policy with a focus on the Middle East. She graduated from Columbia with her Master of International Affairs in 2004.

== Career ==
=== U.S. Government ===
In 2003, Chemali held an internship position at the United Nations Department for Political Affairs. She was later hired by the United States government as a Legislative Fellow for the Office of Congressman Christopher Shays in Connecticut, where she stayed until 2006.

Chemali joined the United States Department of the Treasury in 2006 as a Special Advisor to then Deputy Assistant Secretary for Terrorist Financing and Financial Crimes, Daniel Glaser. She became a Policy Advisor on the Middle East in 2007 where she remained until 2010.

Chemali held a number of policy-making and public affairs positions during Barack Obama's presidency. In 2010, she became the Director for Syria and Lebanon at the National Security Council (NSC), where she worked on U.S. foreign policy toward Syria and Lebanon, including during the first year and a half of the Syria crisis.

At the end of 2012, Chemali returned to the Treasury Department and became a Senior Policy Advisor on Asia with the Treasury Department's Office of Terrorist Financing and Financial Crimes. In 2014, she became the Spokesperson for Terrorism and Financial Intelligence at the U.S. Treasury Department. From 2015 to 2016, Chemali was the Spokesperson and Director of Communications for the U.S. Mission to the United Nations under President Obama.

=== In media ===
After leaving the U.S. Government in 2016, Chemali has occasionally served as a political commentator, speaking mostly as a foreign policy analyst.

She appears as a frequent contributor on Bloomberg programs such as "Balance of Power," where she engages in detailed discussions on geopolitical developments including the Israel-Hamas conflict and regional diplomacy.

Chemali founded Greenwich Media Strategies in 2016, a communications consulting firm. In 2019, she became a Senior Nonresident Fellow with the Atlantic Council's GeoEconomics Center. In 2020, she launched a weekly world news show on YouTube called Oh My World!

== Personal life ==
Hagar married private equity operating executive, Julien Chemali, in 2010. They have three children. Chemali is on the board of directors for the Greenwich United Way and the Serve America Movement (SAM), as well as her alma mater Greenwich Academy.
