= Greenwich Academy =

Girls school in Greenwich, Connecticut, US

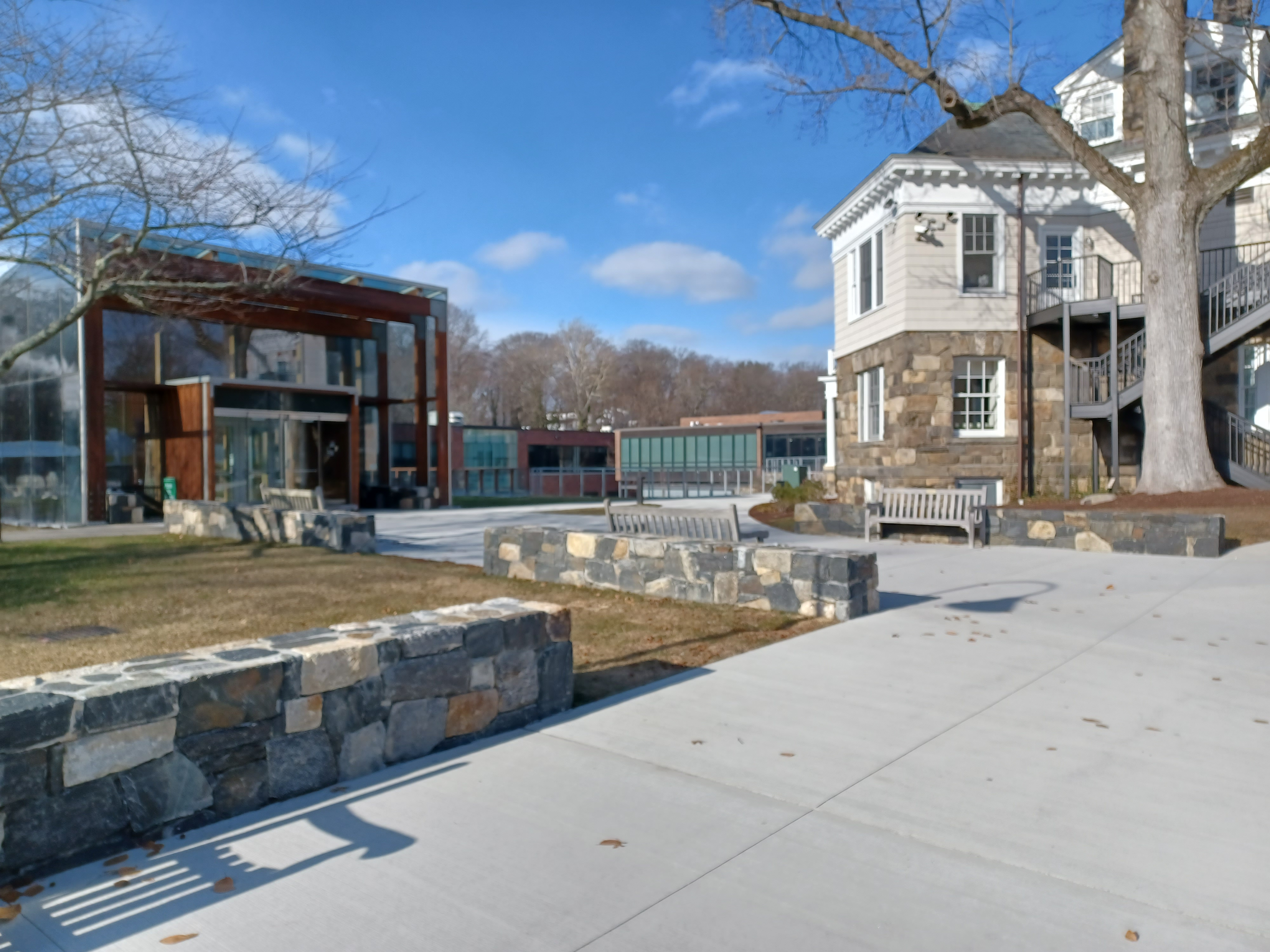

Location
- 200 North Maple Avenue; Greenwich, Fairfield County, Connecticut 06830; United States; 41°02′35″N 73°37′38″W

Information
- School type: Private college-preparatory school Single sex education (all girls – since 1913)
- Motto: Latin: "Ad Ingenium Faciendum" ("Toward the Building of Character")
- Established: 1827 (199 years ago)
- Teaching staff: 105.8 (FTE) (2015–16)
- Grades: PK–12
- Gender: all girls
- Enrollment: 795 (774 K-12) (2015–16)
- Student to teacher ratio: 7.3∶1 (2015–16)
- Campus size: 39 acres (0.16 km^{2})
- Campus type: Suburban
- Colors: Green and gold
- Athletics: 15 varsity sports
- Athletics conference: New England Preparatory School Athletic Council (NEPSAC)
- Mascot: Gator
- Rival: Sacred Heart Greenwich; Baldwin School; Hopkins School; Hotchkiss School
- Accreditation: New England Association of Schools and Colleges (NEASC)
- Website: www.greenwichacademy.org
- Last updated: June 6, 2019; 7 years ago

Greenwich Academy is an independent, college-preparatory day school for girls in Greenwich (Fairfield County), Connecticut. Founded in 1827 (199 years ago), it is the oldest girls' school / single sex education school in the state of Connecticut.

== History ==
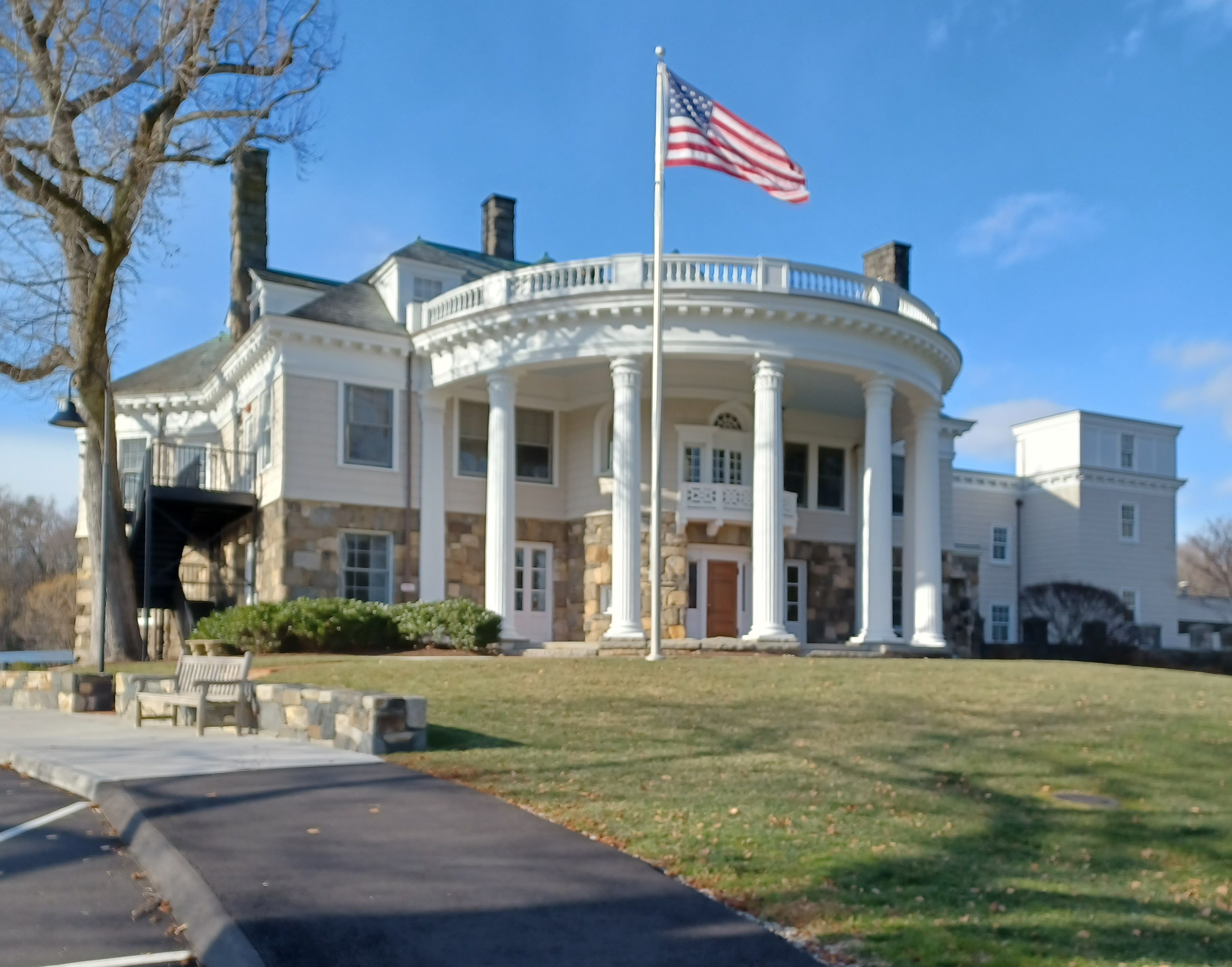
Front of Greenwich Academy's administrative building

Greenwich Academy was founded in 1827 by members of the Congregationalist Church (in America since c. 1648, of the 16th century Reformation era tradition and theological orientation of Protestant / Reformed / Congregationalism branch of Western Christianity, now merged in the last 67 years into the modern denomination of the United Church of Christ since 1957).

For 86 years, until after the turn of the 20th century, the school admitted both girls and boys. Then, in 1900 / 1902, a Greenwich Academy English teacher founded the nearby parallel Brunswick School for Boys (also in Greenwich, Connecticut). As an eventual consequence, thirteen years later in 1913, the Greenwich Academy Board of Trustees formally approved the decision to accept only girls as future students / graduates in the Middle and Upper Schools, and after 86 years as a coeducational academic institution, the Greenwich Academy was reconceived after that year as a day school for girls.

== Coordination ==
Since 1971, the Greenwich Academy has had a coordinated academic / social relationship with the all-boys student body of the nearby Brunswick School, founded 1900 / 1902. Brunswick's upper school is located across the street of North Maple Avenue from G.A. and high school students can take classes on both campuses. Almost all classes at G.A. and Brunswick are coeducational (co-ed).

== Signature programs ==
=== Engineering and Design Lab ===
Greenwich Academy's Engineering & Design Lab (EDL) was established in 2013. It is a fully equipped, digital fabrication space with machines including 3D printers, laser cutters, vinyl cutters, and CNC machines. In addition to digital manufacturing capabilities, the space offers carpentry and hand-building tools, microcontrollers, electronics, and a wide variety of materials for building. Students and faculty across divisions have access to the space and support for their projects. The lab's director, Erin Riley, is a Senior FabLearn Fellow out of Stanford University's Transformative Learning Technologies Lab.

=== GAINS (Girls Advancing in STEM) Network ===
The GAINS Network was founded by Greenwich Academy in 2011 to provide an online social platform for young women interested in science, technology, engineering and math.

== Notable alumnae ==
- Hagar Chemali, writer and television personality
- Jane Fonda, model, actress, political / social activist.
- Shelley Hack, model and actress.
- Jenny Hoffman, physicist
- Jean Holzworth, veterinarian.
- Margaret F. Hood, musical builder
- Radhika Jones, former editor-in-chief, Vanity Fair magazine
- Kelly Rohrbach, model and actress.
- Maia Shibutani, Olympics ice dancer.
- Caroline Simmons, mayor of Stamford, Connecticut
- Ethel Skakel Kennedy (1928–2024), human rights activist, co-founder of Para Olympics games, and widow of assassinated U.S. Senator, 1968 presidential candidate and U.S. Attorney General Robert F. Kennedy of New York / Massachusetts.
- Allison Williams, actress, comedian, and singer.
