= Margaret F. Hood =

American musical instrument builder

Margaret Hood
- Born: Margaret Holmes Fullerton; November 19, 1937; New York City, New York, U.S.
- Died: June 7, 2008 (aged 70); Platteville, Wisconsin, U.S.
- Education: Mount Holyoke College (BA); Pacific School of Religion (MA)
- Spouse: Ellsworth Hood (m. 1961)
- Children: 2

Margaret F. Hood (November 19, 1937 – June 7, 2008) was an American fortepiano, clavichord, and harpsichord builder.

== Early life and education ==
Hood was born Margaret Holmes Fullerton in New York City. She grew up in Greenwich, Connecticut, and graduated from the Greenwich Academy in 1954. She then studied philosophy, religion, and art at Mount Holyoke College. Later she completed her master's degree at the Pacific School of Religion while doing calligraphic and artifact restoration work for the Bade Archeological Museum. During this time she became noted as a painter.

== Career ==
In 1962, Hood was awarded a Danforth Fellowship at Duke University.

Her interest in musical instruments, especially harpsichords, began in the mid-1960s, through kits she completed for others. Through this work, she also became interested in historically appropriate harpsichord case and soundboard painting. In the 1970s she became a professional builder of her original designs for harpsichords, clavichords, and fortepianos, and was also an agent for Zuckermann Harpsichords.

After researching museum instruments in Europe and the United States, she founded Margaret Hood Fortepianos, in Platteville, Wisconsin, in 1976. By the mid-1980s she was well known for her reproductions of 1803 and 1816 pianos by Nannette Streicher, as well as her research and publications about Streicher, Beethoven and the instruments of his time. Her premature death left her extensive work on the Beethoven conversation books incomplete. Her last (unfinished) instrument was based on a Streicher fortepiano from 1816, before Nanette Streicher and her son Johann Baptiste became business partners. In addition, Hood wrote and published technical repair and maintenance manuals for both harpsichords and fortepianos.

== Personal life ==
Hood married Ellsworth Hood in 1961 and had two children.

Several members of her family were painters, and she continued the tradition with an extensive repertoire of styles and techniques. She later added to that tradition by applying her artistic talents and skills to the painting of historically appropriate paintings and decorations on the lids and soundboards of harpsichords.

Hood's love of horses remained with her throughout her life. She developed her skills not only in riding but in training in the English traditions of show jumping, cross country and dressage. Boxes of ribbons attest to the level of her success in horsemanship.

== Publications ==
- The Fortepiano Maintenance Handbook, 1998
- The Harpsichord Repair Guide, 2003
- Review of three books on piano building, in the Journal of Musicologial Research, volume 16, number 4, 1997, pp. 301–305, ISSN 0141-1896
