= Shukan NY Seikatsu =

Weekly news publication

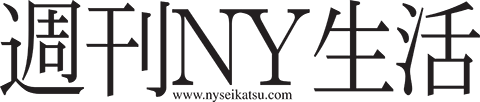
- Type: Weekly Newspaper
- Format: Tabloid
- Owner(s): New York Seikatsu Press, Inc.
- Publisher: Ryoichi Miura
- Founded: 2004
- Language: Japanese
- Headquarters: 71 West 47th St. Suite 1205, New York, NY 10036
- Circulation: 20,000
- Free online archives: www.nyseikatsu.com

The Shukan NY Seikatsu (週刊NY生活) is a free independent Japanese weekly newspaper which focuses on news and life in the New York tri-state area and across the United States. It is published every Thursday. The paper was co-founded by publisher Ryoichi Miura and Shigeru Hisamatsu, who had previously worked for Yomiuri America, in 2004.

With a base in New York, New Jersey, and Connecticut, and delivered along with major Japanese dailies, the Asahi Shimbun and the Nikkei, in Westchester, New Jersey, Ohio, and Washington, D.C., the Shukan NY Seikatsu has a circulation of 20,000. Since 2005, the paper is also available in Japan, at locations such as the Tokyo Ōte-machi branch of Books Kinokuniya.

Seeking to expand its circulation, in 2013, the paper added an English section, which is primarily a translation of select articles from the previous week's edition.

== See also ==
- Japanese in New York City
