= Brunswick School =

Prep school in Greenwich, Connecticut, US

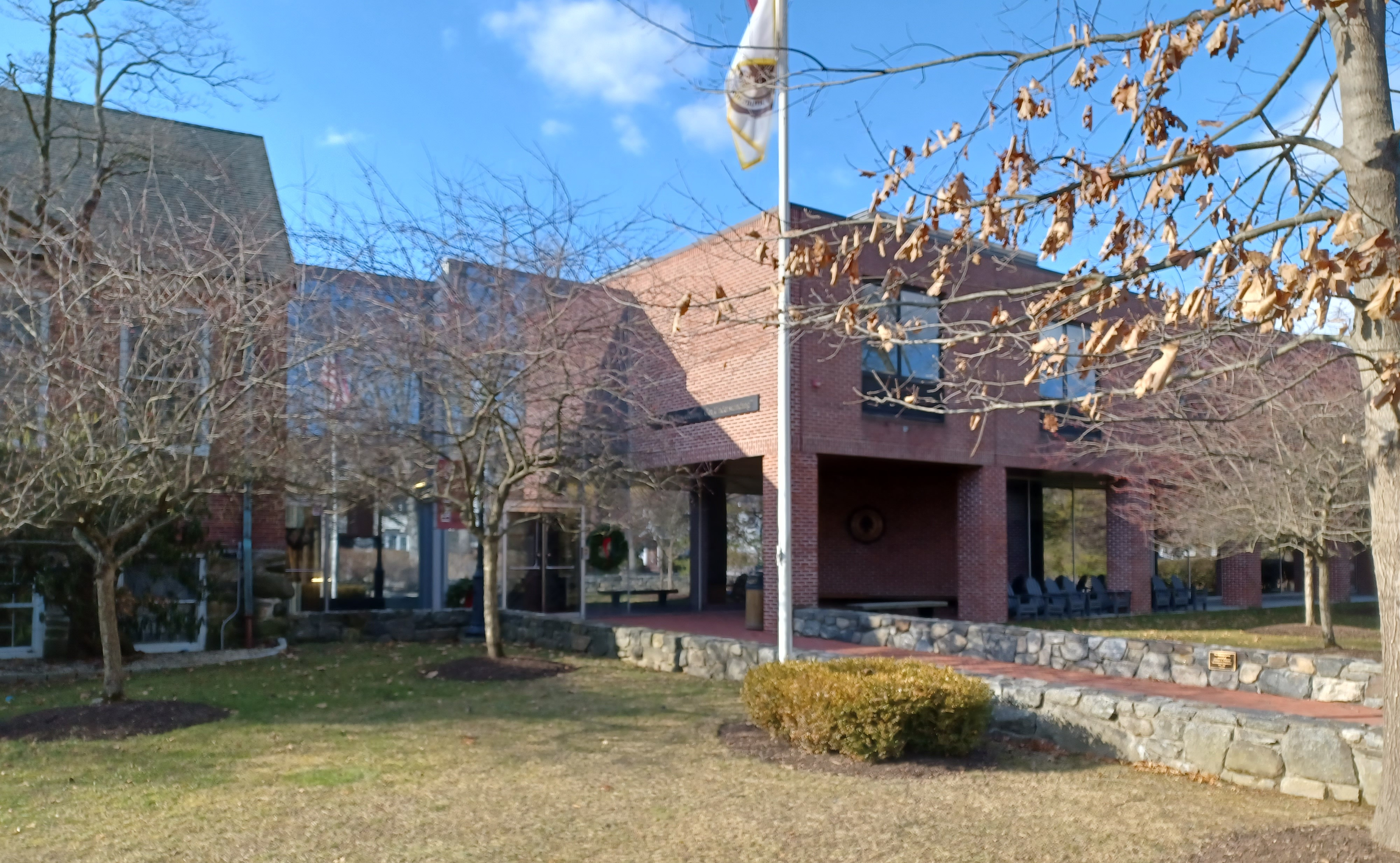
- Upper School

Location
- 100 Maher Avenue; Greenwich, Connecticut 06830; United States; 41°02′16″N 73°37′34″W

Information
- Type: Private, college-preparatory school
- Motto: Courage, Honor, Truth
- Established: 1902 (124 years ago)
- Founder: George B. Carmichael
- Sister school: Greenwich Academy
- CEEB code: 070219
- NCES School ID: 00233148
- Headmaster: Thomas Philip
- Teaching staff: 136.6 (on an FTE basis)
- Grades: PK–12
- Gender: Boys
- Enrollment: 1,020 (2019–2020)
- Student to teacher ratio: 6.83
- Colors: Brown, white, gold
- Mascot: Bruin
- Website: www.brunswickschool.org

Brunswick School is a private, college-preparatory school for boys in Greenwich, Connecticut, United States. It was founded in 1902 by George B. Carmichael.

== History ==
Brunswick School was founded in 1902 by George B. Carmichael. The school is a college preparatory day school serving approximately 1,020 boys in grades pre-kindergarten through 12.

Brunswick was scheduled to take over the former Carmel Academy, which closed its school operations in 2020. Brunswick planned to convert the site, which also previously held the Japanese School of New York (Greenwich Japanese School), into a preschool and housing for employees. The Japanese School had moved into another facility in Greenwich. Brunswick acquired the former Carmel Academy site in September 2023.

== Facilities ==
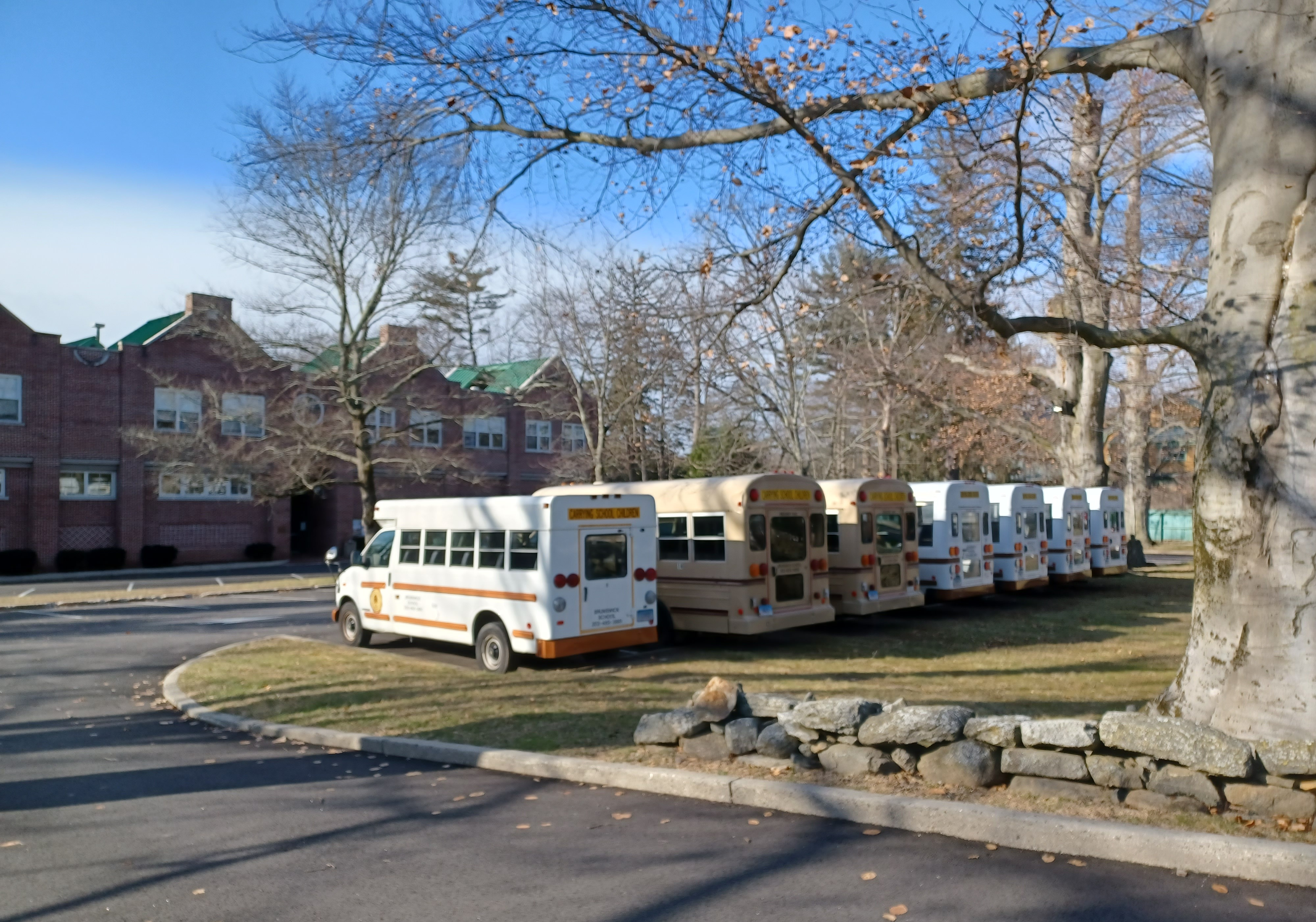
Upper School English and History annex

Brunswick school is made up of two main campuses. The Upper School campus is located on 100 Maher Avenue in Greenwich. The Upper School English and History annex is located on North Maple Avenue, a short walk from the main Upper School facility, occupying the former Preschool campus. Also found at the North Maple facility is the Brunswick Career Center, which puts an emphasis on preparing recent alumni for the workforce. The Edwards Campus (named after former headmaster Duncan Edwards, II) is located about 15 minutes away from the Maher Avenue campus on King Street. The Edwards Campus is made up of the Middle School, Lower School, Preschool School facilities, along with the Burke Fieldhouse (basketball, wrestling, tennis, and the Cosby Weight Room) and the Sampson Fieldhouse (which houses the Dann O'Neil Gym, the Stephens Squash Courts, and Hartong Rink). The Edwards Campus also hosts a set of rowing tanks in the Preschool. Additionally, Brunswick owns a boat house, the Falco Rowing Center, located on River Road, just a ten-minute drive from the Upper School campus. Brunswick also owns a satellite campus in Randolph, VT, called the Randolph Campus. The campus is used for sophomore leadership trips during the school year.

=== Athletics facilities ===
- Mehra Natatorium
- Sampson Athletic Center
- Burke Field House
- Falco Rowing Center
- Dann Gymnasium
- Redahan Athletic Training Center
- Richman Tennis Center
- Robert L. Cosby Field
- Caputo Field and Smith Field
- Carroll Field

== Coordination with Greenwich Academy ==
Brunswick's sister school is Greenwich Academy, which is located two blocks from Brunswick's Upper School campus. The two schools share classes with each other during Upper School, and students are able to choose some courses from a combined course catalogue, with the exception of mathematics courses and ninth grade English, which remain separate. The connection between Greenwich Academy and Brunswick dates back to the school's founding. The founder of Brunswick had been previously employed as a teacher at Greenwich Academy, which was then a co-educational secondary school. After the founding of Brunswick, Greenwich Academy began admitting girls alone, directing boys to apply to Brunswick School.

== Notable alumni ==
- Akin Akingbala, former basketball player for Clemson University and the Boston Celtics
- Hayward Alker, international relations scholar
- Neil Burger, film director
- Peter Corroon, former mayor of Salt Lake County, Utah
- Peter Fonda, actor
- Paul Greenberg, James Beard Award-winning author and environmentalist
- John Hayden, ice hockey player for the Arizona Coyotes
- Pete Francis Heimbold, former member of the band Dispatch
- Matthew Heineman, Oscar-nominated filmmaker
- Justin Henry, actor
- Chris Jenkins (sound engineer), Oscar-winning sound engineer
- Hugh Jessiman, hockey player
- Cornelius Johnson (wide receiver), American football player
- Rod Lurie, film director
- David J. Malan, Harvard University computer science professor
- Mitch Marrow, American football player
- Justin McAuliffe, businessman and member of the Hilton family
- Aaron Sabato, baseball player
- James Sands, soccer player
- Brad Seaton, former American football player for Villanova University and various NFL teams
- Kevin Shattenkirk, hockey player
- Alex Shibutani, Olympic figure skater
- Bill Simmons, sports columnist
- Cameron Winklevoss, Olympic rower and social networking pioneer
- Tyler Winklevoss, Olympic rower and social networking pioneer
