= Princeton Community Japanese Language School =

Weekend school in Princeton, New Jersey

- プリンストン日本語学校

Location
- Location of the administrative office in Princeton
- Rider University, 2083 Lawrenceville Road; Lawrenceville, New Jersey 08648-3001; United States; 40.351894°N 74.654946°W

Information
- Type: Japanese language school, including a supplementary school
- Established: 1980
- Campus: Bierenbaum Fisher Hall, Rider University
- Website: www.pcjls.org

The Princeton Community Japanese Language School (PCJLS; プリンストン日本語学校 Purinsuton Nihongo Gakkō) is a Japanese weekend school in the Princeton, New Jersey area. It holds weekend Japanese classes for Japanese citizen children abroad to the standard of the Ministry of Education, Culture, Sports, Science and Technology (MEXT), and it also has classes for people with Japanese as a second language.

Courses are held at Bierenbaum Fisher Hall (formerly Memorial Hall) at Rider University in Lawrence Township, Mercer County. The school offices are in Princeton, except on Sundays, when the offices are at Rider University.

This is one of the Japanese weekend school systems in the New York metropolitan area.

== History ==
Five Japanese researchers at Princeton University founded the PCJLS in 1980. It was originally at that institution but moved to Rider in 1996.

In 1987, its weekend courses for children covered Kindergarten through the 7th grade.

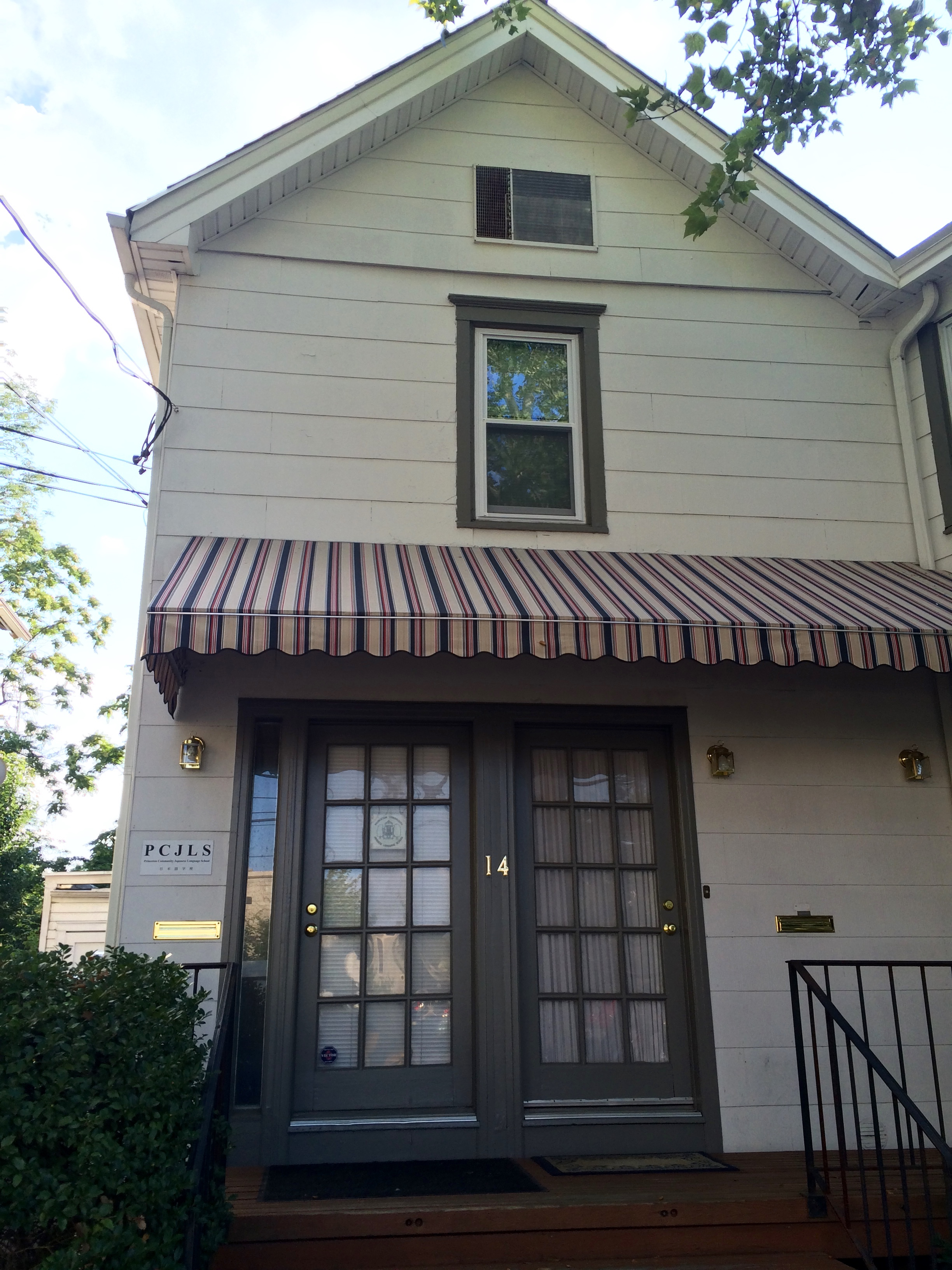
The school offices at 14 Moore Street

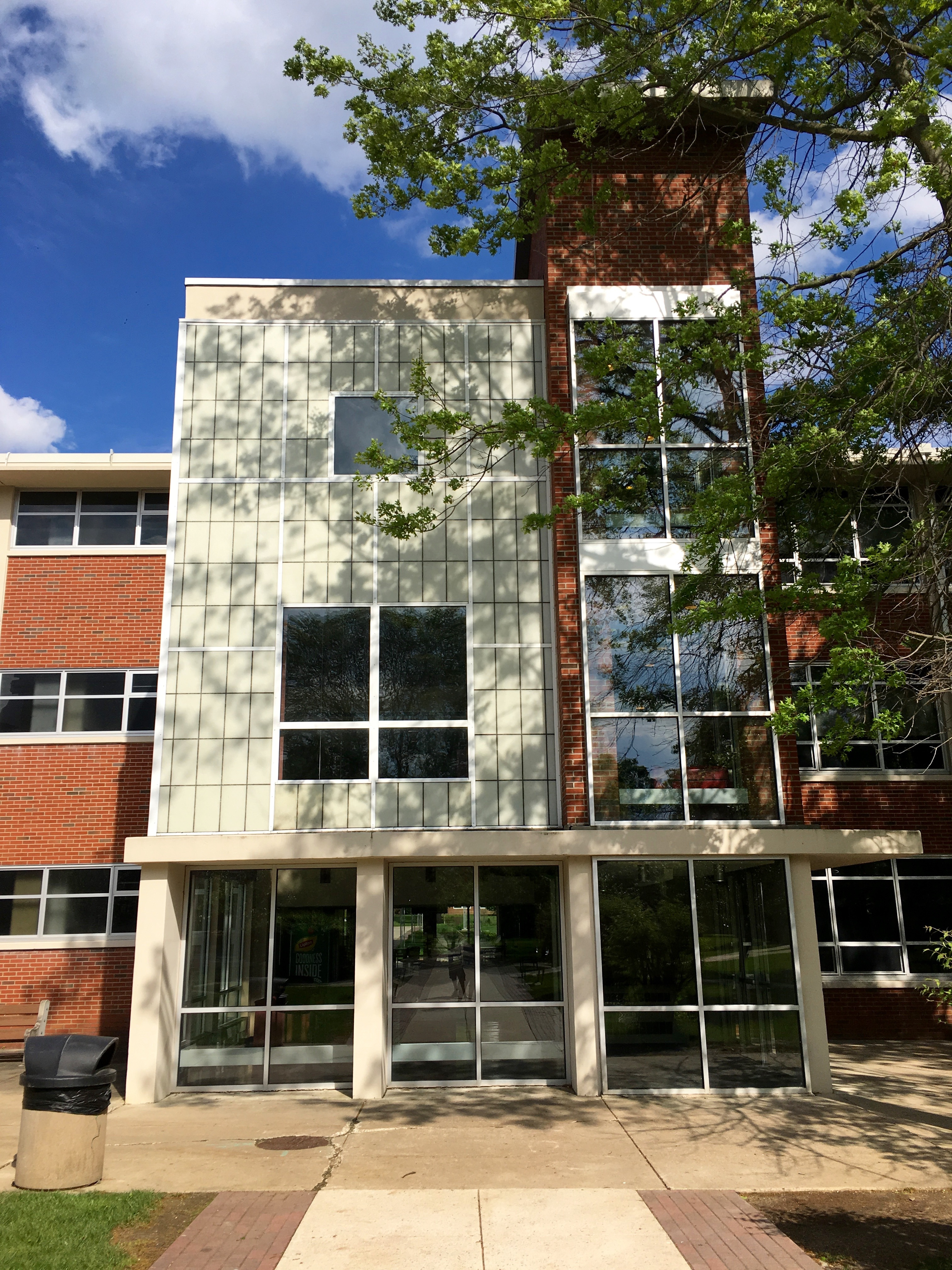
Memorial Hall (now Bierenbaum Fisher Hall) at Rider University, where the school's classes are held

== Curriculum ==
The school's Japanese Ministry of Education (MEXT)-compliant classes are part of its Division 1. The principal of Division 1 is funded by MEXT. In addition, the school offers Japanese heritage language courses, Japanese as a foreign language courses, and courses for adults as part of Division 2, which is oriented to children attending university in the United States and other persons from English-dominant households. The school's teachers developed their own kanji textbooks for use in these courses. Placement into a particular division involves consultations in which the student, the parents, and/or PCJLS teachers are involved.

In 1987, the school also had Japanese language courses for adults who work in businesses.

== Student body ==
Many PCJLS students are U.S. permanent residents with at least some Japanese ancestral origin, including multilingual students with one or more parents who speak a language not English and/or not Japanese, and/or bilingual students living in English-dominant households. These students often attend heritage classes and/or Japanese as a second language courses.

In 1987, students came from the states of New Jersey, Pennsylvania, and Delaware. Some of the students came from Fort Lee and some came from South Jersey.

In 1987 the school had around 20-25 adult students and 100 child students.

== Teaching staff ==
Parents, as of 2012, make up 70% of the teachers at PCJLS.

== See also ==
- Japanese Weekend School of New York - Another Japanese weekend school system in the New York City area
- Japanese language education in the United States
