= Hoshū jugyō kō =

Weekend schools for Japanese persons outside of Japan

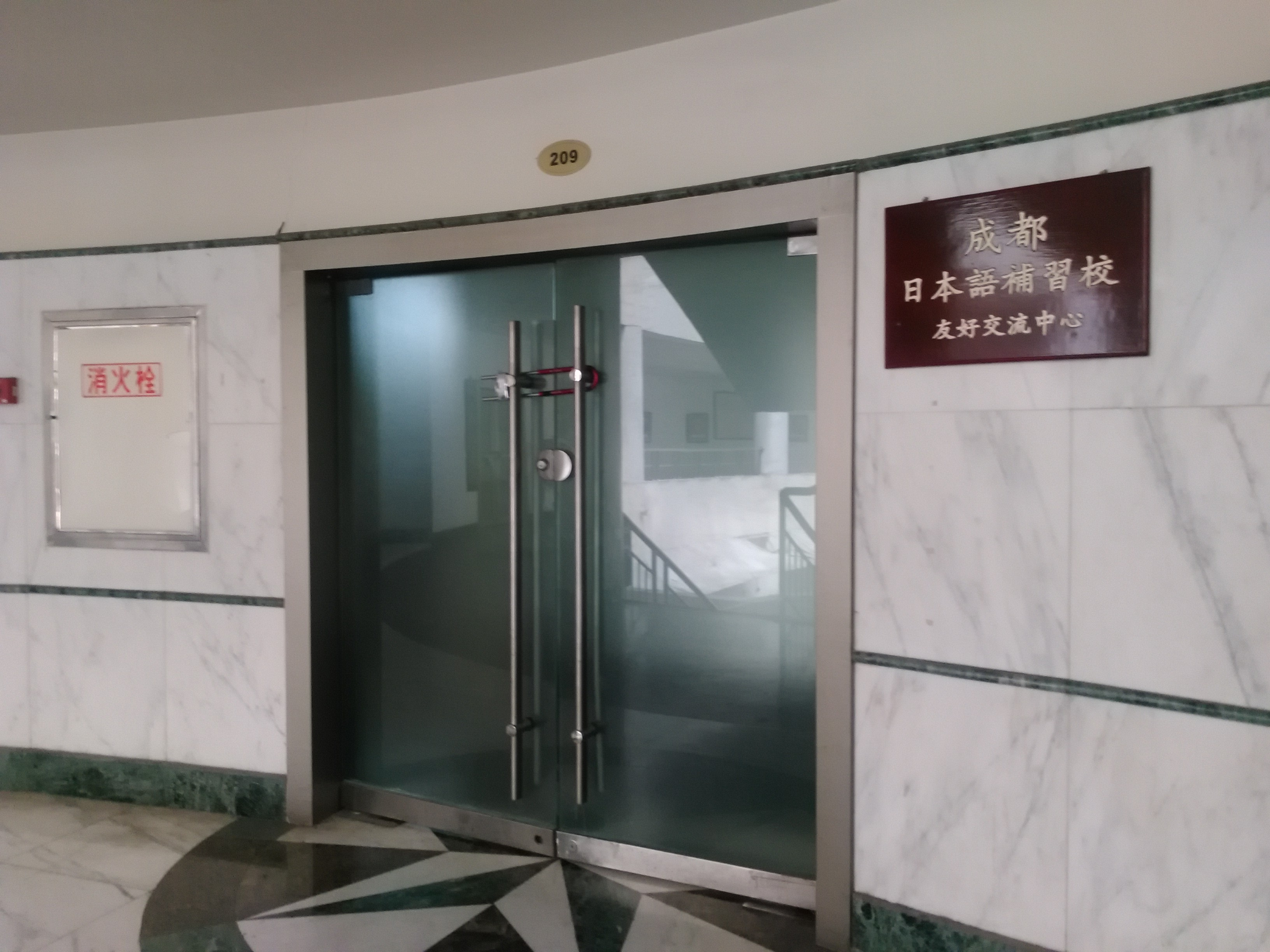
The Chengdu Hoshuko (Japanese: 成都日本語補習校; Chinese: 成都日本语补习校), a hoshū jugyō kō in the Hiroshima-Sichuan Sino-Japanese Friendship Convention Center (広島・四川中日友好会館; 广岛・四川中日友好会馆) in Wuhou District, Chengdu, Sichuan

Hoshū jugyō kō (補習授業校), or hoshūkō (補習校), are supplementary Japanese schools located in foreign countries for students living abroad with their families. Hoshū jugyō kō educate Japanese-born children who attend local day schools. They generally operate on weekends, after school, and other times not during the hours of operation of the day schools.

The Ministry of Education, Science, Sports and Culture (Monbusho), as of 1985, encouraged the opening of hoshū jugyō kō in developed countries. It also encouraged the development of full-time day schools for Japanese students (nihonjin gakkō) in developing countries. In 1971, there were 22 supplementary Japanese schools worldwide.

By May 1986, Japan operated 112 supplementary schools worldwide, having a total of 1,144 teachers, most of them Japanese nationals, and 15,086 students. The number of supplementary schools increased to 120 by 1987. As of April 15, 2010, there are 201 Japanese supplementary schools in 56 countries.

== Operations ==
These schools, which usually hold classes on weekends, are primarily designed to serve the children of Japanese residents temporarily residing in foreign countries so that, upon returning to their home country, they can easily re-adapt to the Japanese educational system. As a consequence, students at these schools, whether they are Japanese nationals and/or permanent residents of the host country, are generally taught in the age-appropriate Japanese curriculum specified by the Ministry of Education, Culture, Sports, Science and Technology (MEXT). Article 26 of the Constitution of Japan guarantees compulsory education for Japanese children in grades one through nine, so many weekend schools opened to serve students in those grades. Some weekend schools also serve high school and preschool/kindergarten. Several Japanese weekend schools operate in facilities rented from other educational institutions.

The majority of the instruction is kokugo (Japanese language instruction). The remainder of the curriculum consists of other academic subjects, including mathematics, social studies, and sciences. In order to cover all of the material mandated by the government of Japan in a timely fashion, each school assigns a portion of the curriculum as homework, because it is not possible to cover all material during class hours. Naomi Kano (加納 なおみ, Kanō Naomi), author of "Japanese Community Schools: New Pedagogy for a Changing Population", stated in 2011 that the supplementary schools were dominated by "a monoglossic ideology of protecting the Japanese language from English".

The Japanese government sends full-time teachers to supplementary schools that offer lessons that are similar to those of nihonjin gakkō, and/or those which have student bodies of 100 students each or greater. The number of teachers sent depends upon the enrollment: one teacher is sent for a student enrollment of 100 or more, two for 200 or more students, three for 800 or more students, four for 1,200 or more students, and five for 1,600 or more students. MEXT also subsidizes those weekend schools that each have over 100 students.

=== North America ===
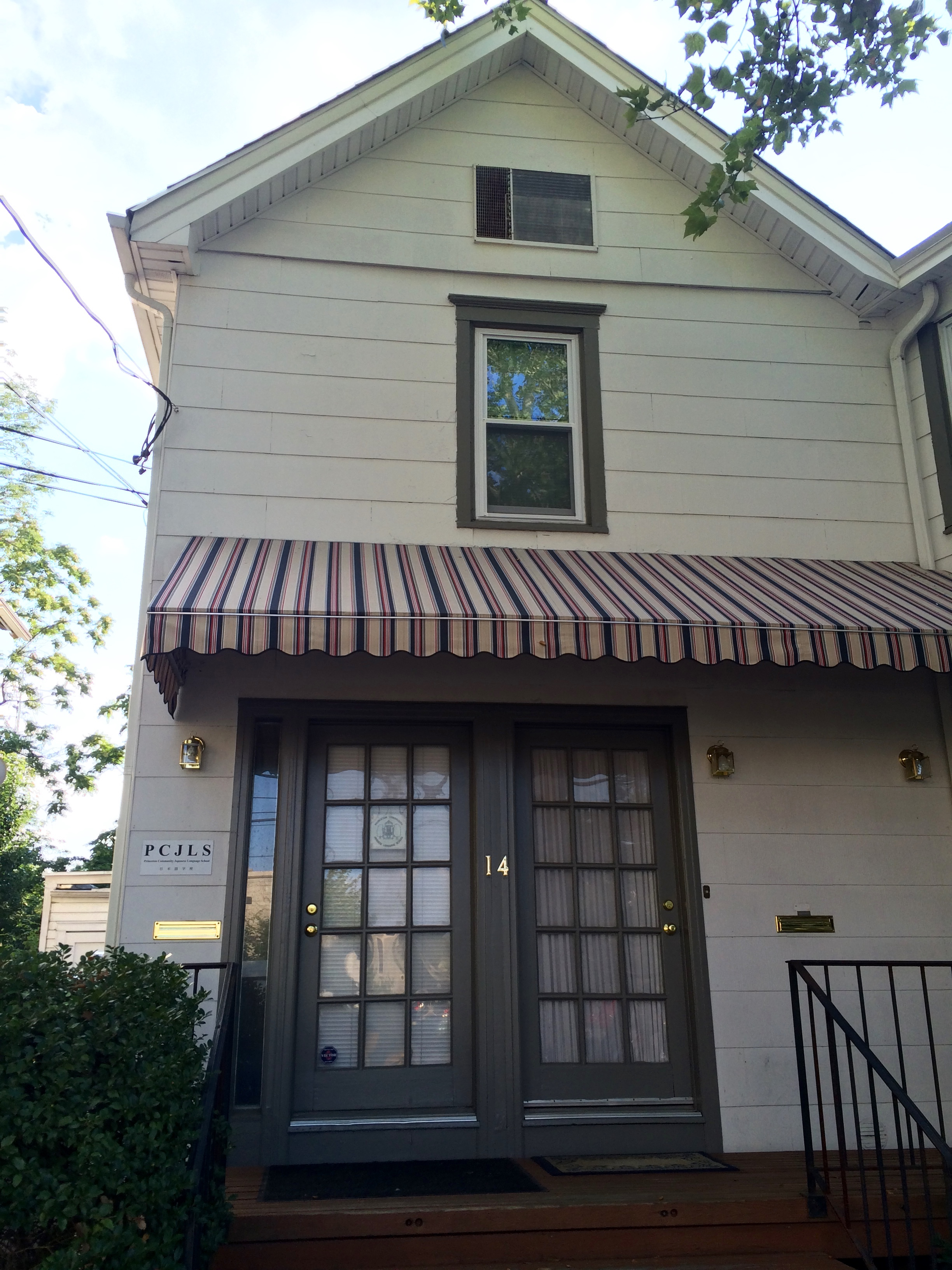
The offices of the Princeton Community Japanese Language School in Princeton, New Jersey

In North America, the hoshūkō are usually operated by the local Japanese communities. They are equivalent to hagwon in ethnic Korean communities and Chinese schools in ethnic Chinese communities. These Japanese schools primarily serve Japanese nationals from families temporarily in the United States, or kikokushijo, and second-generation Japanese Americans. The latter may be U.S. citizens or they may have dual U.S.-Japanese citizenship. Because few Japanese children with Japanese as a first language in North America attend full-time Japanese schools, the majority of these children receive their primary education in English, their second language. These supplementary schools exist to provide their Japanese-language education.

Rachel Endo of Hamline University, the author of "Realities, Rewards, and Risks of Heritage-Language Education: Perspectives from Japanese Immigrant Parents in a Midwestern Community", wrote that these schools "have rigorous academic expectations and structured content".

As of 2012 the most common education option for Japanese families resident in the United States, especially those living in major metropolitan areas, is to send children to American schools during the week and use weekend Japanese schools to supplement their education. As of 2007 there were 85 Japanese supplementary schools in the United States. Some 12,500 children of Japanese nationality living in the United States attended both Japanese weekend schools and American day schools. They make up more than 60% of the total number of children of Japanese nationality resident in the United States.

In the 1990s, weekend schools began creating keishōgo, or "heritage education", classes for permanent residents of the U.S. The administrators and teachers of each weekend school that offers "heritage classes" develop their own curriculum. In the years prior to 2012, there was an increase in the number of students who were permanent residents of the United States and did not plan to go back to Japan. Instead, they attended the schools "to maintain their ethnic identity". By that year, the majority of students in the Japanese weekend schools in the United States were permanent residents of the United States. Kano argued that the MEXT curriculum for many of these permanent residents is unnecessary and out of touch.

The oldest U.S. Japanese weekend school with Japanese government sponsorship is the Washington Japanese Language School (ワシントン日本語学校, Washington Nihongo Gakkō), founded in 1958 and serving the Washington, DC metropolitan area.

=== United Kingdom ===
The MEXT has eight Saturday Japanese supplementary schools in operation in the U.K. As of 2013, 2,392 Japanese children in Hythe, Cardiff, Derby, Edinburgh (school is in Livingston), Leeds, London, Manchester (school is in Lymm), Sunderland (school is in Oxclose), and Telford attend these schools.

- Derby Japanese School (ダービー日本人補習校, Dābī Nihonjin Hoshūkō) – Morley, Erewash, Derbyshire
- Japanese Saturday School in London
- Japanese School in Wales (ウェールズ補習授業校, Wēruzu Hoshū Jugyō Kō) – Cardiff
- Kent Japanese School (ケント日本語補習校, Kento Nihongo Hoshū Jugyō Kō) – Located in Hythe – Its time of establishment is August 2005
- Manchester Japanese School (マンチェスター日本人補習授業校, Manchesutā Nihonjin Hoshū Jugyō Kō) – Lymm, Warrington, Cheshire
- Yorkshire and Humberside Japanese School (ヨークシャーハンバーサイド日本語補習校, Yōkushā Hanbāsaido Nihongo Hoshūkō) — Leeds
- The Scotland Japanese School (スコットランド日本語補習授業校, Sukottorando Nihongo Hoshū Jugyō Kō)) – Livingston (near Edinburgh), established in 1982
- Telford Japanese School (テルフォード補習授業校, Terufōdo Hoshū Jugyō Kō) – Stirchley, Telford
- North East of England Japanese Saturday School (北東イングランド補習授業校, Hokutō Ingurando Hoshū Jugyō Kō) – Oxclose, Tyne and Wear (near Newcastle-upon-Tyne)

== Demographics ==
In 2003, 51.7% of pupils of Japanese nationality in North America attended both hoshūkō and local North American day schools.

As of 2013, in Asia 3.4% of children of Japanese nationality and speaking Japanese as a first language attend Japanese weekend schools in addition to their local schools. In North America that year, 45% of children of Japanese nationality and speaking Japanese as a first language attend Japanese weekend schools in addition to their local schools.

== List of schools ==
See: List of hoshū jugyō kō

== See also ==
- Japanese language education in the United States
