= List of hoshū jugyō kō =

The following is a list of hoshū jugyō kō (supplementary weekend Japanese schools) that are or were recognized as such by the Ministry of Education of Japan (MEXT).

== Africa ==
Locations of hoshū jugyō kō in Africa (those of blue dots have teachers sent from Japan while those of green dots do not)

With teachers from Japan:

- Tanzania
  - Dar Es Salaam Japanese Language Class (ダレサラム補習授業校 Daresaramu Hoshū Jugyō Kō) – Established on January 1, 1972 (Shōwa 47).

Without teachers from Japan:

- Ethiopia
  - Addis Ababa Japanese School (アジス・アベバ補習授業校 Ajisu Abeba Hoshū Jugyō Kō)
- Ghana
  - Ghana Japanese Children's School (アクラ補習授業校 Akura Hoshū Jugyō Kō) – Accra
- Ivory Coast
  - École japonaise d'Abidjan (アビジャン補習授業校 Abijan Hoshū Jugyō Kō) – Abidjan
- Libya
  - Japanese Supplemental School in Tripoli (トリポリ補習授業校 Toripori Hoshū Jugyō Kō) – at International School of Tripoli
- Morocco
  - Cours supplémentaires de langue japonaise de Rabat (ラバト補習授業校 Rabato Hoshū Jugyō Kō)
- Tunisia
  - Cours de langue japonaise de Tunis (チュニス補習授業校 Chunisu Hoshū Jugyō Kō)
- Zimbabwe
  - Japanese Pupils Class in Harare

== Asia ==
Locations of hoshū jugyō kō in Asia, Russia, and Turkey (those of blue dots have teachers sent from Japan while those of green dots do not)

With teachers from Japan:

- India
  - Japanese School Educational Trust of Chennai (チェンナイ補習授業校 Chennai Hoshū Jugyō Kō) – at American International School Chennai, Taramani
    - Established by the Japanese Association in Chennai (チェンナイ日本人会 Chennai Nihonjin Kai), it opened in June 1975 as the Japanese Class of Madras (マドラス日本語補習教室 Madorasu Nihongo Hoshū Kyōshitsu). In 1998 the school adopted the name Japanese Language School of Chennai (チェンナイ日本語補習校 Chennai Nihongo Hoshū Jugyō Kō) since Madras took the name Chennai. The school moved to AIS Chennai in 2003. It adopted its current name in 2005 so it could register as a trust, as per the Trust Act.
- Singapore
  - The Japanese Supplementary School Singapore (JSS; シンガポール日本語補習授業校 Shingapōru Nihongo Hoshū Jugyō Kō)

Without teachers from Japan:

- Cambodia
  - Japanese Supplementary School of Phnom Penh (プノンペン補習授業校 Punonpen Hoshū Jugyō Kō), formerly known in English as the Phnom Penh Japanese School, in Sangkat Toek Thla in Sen Sok Section. It was established in 2002. It had 60 students in June 2011.
- People's Republic of China
  - Nanjing Japanese Saturday School (南京補習授業校 Nankin Hoshū Jugyō Kō) – Nanjing International School, Qixia District, Nanjing
  - Ningbo Saturday School (寧波(ﾆﾝﾎﾞｰ)補習授業校 Ninbō Hoshū Jugyō Kō)
  - Shenyang Saturday School (瀋陽補習授業校 Shenyan Hoshū Jugyō Kō) – It was established in April 2006 and is in Shenhe District, Shenyang
  - Shenzhen Saturday School (深・(ｼﾝｾﾝ)補習授業校 Shinsen Hoshū Jugyō Kō, formerly SHENZHEN日本人補習校) – Office on the 8th floor of the Jinsanjiao Building (金三角大厦/金三角大廈) in Baishizhou, Nanshan District. Previously based in the Ming Wah International Convention Centre (明华国际会议中心) in Shekou.
  - Wuxi Japanese Saturday School (無錫(ﾑｼｬｸ)補習授業校 Mujaku Hoshū Jugyō Kō) – Wuxi New Area – Established April 14, 2006
  - Zhuhai Japanese Saturday School (珠海日本人補習校) – classes at QSI International School of Zhuhai
  - Hong Kong Japanese Supplementary School (HKJSS; 香港日本人補習授業校 Honkon Nihonjin Hoshū Jugyō Kō)
- India
  - Japanese Supplementary School of Bangalore (バンガロール日本人補習授業校 Bangarōru Nihonjin Hoshū Jugyō Kō) - Previously at Koramangala School, it later moved to Canadian International School, effective February 2010. It is run at Trio World Academy, where it has been since September 2022, during weekends.
- Indonesia
  - Japanese School of Bali (JJC Bali; バリ補習授業校 Bari Hoshū Jugyō Kō) – Denpasar
  - Makassar Japanese Language Class
- Laos
  - Vientiane Japanese School (ビエンチャン補習授業校 Bienchan Hoshū Jugyō Kō)
- Malaysia
  - Perak Japanese School (ペラ補習授業校 Pera Hoshū Jugyō Kō)
- Nepal
  - Kathmandu Japanese Supplementary School (カトマンズ補習授業校 Katomanzu Hoshū Jugyō Kō)
- Philippines
  - Cebu Japanese School (CJS; セブ補習授業校 Sebu Hoshū Jugyō Kō) – Mandaue City
- Republic of China on Taiwan
  - Taipei Japanese Supplementary School (台北日本語授業校 Taihoku Nihongo Jugyō Kō)
- Thailand
  - Chiangmai Japanese Supplement School (チェンマイ補習授業校 Chenmai Hoshū Jugyō Kō)
  - Phuket Japanese Supplement School (プーケット補習授業校 Pūketto Hoshū Jugyō Kō)
- Vietnam
  - Ho Chi Minh City Japanese Supplementary School – District 7

Not designated by MEXT:

- Chengdu Hoshuko (成都日本語補習校 Chentū Nihongo Hoshūkō) – Wuhou District, Chengdu, established on February 12, 2012
- Kuala Lumpur Japanese Saturday School (KLJSS; クアラルンプール補習授業校 Kuararunpūru Hoshū Jugyō Kō) – at the Vista Kiara Condominium, Mont Kiara.
- Penang Japanese Saturday School (PJSS; ペナン日本人補習授業校 Penan Hoshū Jugyō Kō) – Opened in January 2012 – Held at KDU Penang

== Europe ==
Locations of hoshū jugyō kō in Europe (those of blue dots have teachers sent from Japan while those of green dots do not – those of red dots have teachers from Japan and are clickable – orange dots do not have teachers from Japan, but are clickable) – Note: the European international schools with Japanese sections are not included on this map for space reasons

With teachers from Japan:

- Belgium
  - Japanese Supplementary School of Brussels
- Sweden
  - Japanska Skolan i Stockholm (ストックホルム日本人補習学校 Sutokkuhorumu Nihonjin Hoshū Gakkō) – Classes at Enskilda Gymnasiet in Tegnérlunden 5, previously at Johannesgatan 18.
- Switzerland
  - École japonaise complémentaire de Genève – Geneva
- United Kingdom
  - Derby Japanese School (ダービー日本人補習校 Dābī Nihonjin Hoshūkō) – Morley, Erewash, Derbyshire
  - Japanese Saturday School in London

Without teachers from Japan:

- Bulgaria
  - Sofia Supplementary School for Japanese Language (ソフィア補習授業校 Sofia Hoshū Jugyō Kō)
- Denmark
  - Japanese Supplemental School in Copenhagen (CPHJPSS; コペンハーゲン日本人補習学校 Kopenhāgen Nihonjin Hoshū Gakkō; Danish: Den Japanske Supplerende Skole – Hellerup
- Finland
  - Helsingin Japanilainen Kouluyhdistys (ヘルシンキ補習授業校 Herushinki Hoshū Jugyō Kō) – Helsinki
- France
  - École complémentaire japonaise de Bordeaux (ボルドー日本語補習授業校 Borudō Nihongo Hoshū Jugyō Kō)
  - École complémentaire pour l'enseignement japonais à Colmar (コルマール補習授業校 Korumāru Hoshū Jugyō Kō)
  - Japanese Supplementary School in Alsace (Strasbourg) (アルザス日本語教育協会 Aruzasu Hoshū Jugyō Kō) – operated by Association Pour l'Enseignement du Japonais en Alsace (APEJA).
    - École complémentaire pour l'enseignement du japonais en Alsace(Strasbourg); Japanische Ergänzungsschule im Elsass (Straßburg)
  - École complémentaire des Japonais de Grenoble (グルノーブル補習授業校 Gurunōburu Hoshū Jugyō Kō) – Meylan
  - École japonaise du Nord-Pas-de-Calais (ノール=パ・ド・カレー日本人学校 Nōru Pa do Karē Nihonjin Gakkō) – Villeneuve-d'Ascq (near Lille)
  - Association pour le développement de la langue et de la culture japonaises (ADLCJ; リヨン補習授業校 Riyon Hoshū Jugyō Kō) Villeurbanne, Greater Lyon) – Formed in 1987
  - École japonaise complémentaire de Marseille (マルセイユ日本語補習授業校 Maruseiyu Nihongo Hoshū Jugyō Kō)
  - École de langue japonaise de Paris (パリ日本語補習校 Pari Nihongo Hoshūkō)
  - Association Éveil Japon (エベイユ学園 Ebeiyu Gakuen) – Boulogne-Billancourt, in the Paris Metropolitan Area
  - École complémentaire japonaise de Rennes (レンヌ補習授業校 Rennu Hoshū Jugyō Kō)
  - École complémentaire japonaise de Toulouse (トゥールーズ補習授業校 Tūrūzu Hoshū Jugyō Kō)
  - École complémentaire japonaise en Touraine (トゥレーヌ補習授業校 Tūrēnu Hoshū Jugyō Kō) – Holds classes for Japanese and Franco-Japanese students at Ecole élémentaire République in Saint-Cyr-sur-Loire. It was established in 1989.
  - École complémentaire japonaise de la Côte d'Azur (コートダジュール補習授業校 Kōtodajūru Hoshū Jugyō Kō) – Valbonne, Sophia Antopolis (near Nice)
  - In addition MEXT lists the Japanese section of the Lycée international de Saint-Germain-en-Laye in Saint-Germain-en-Laye in the Paris area; and the Japanese section (リヨン・ジェルラン補習授業校 Riyon Jeruran Hoshū Jugyō Kō "Lyon Gerland Japanese Supplementary School") of the Cité Scolaire Internationale de Lyon in Lyon, as part-time Japanese schools.
  - Note that New Caledonia is listed under Oceania
- Germany
  - Japanische Ergänzungsschule in Berlin e.V. (ベルリン日本語補習授業校 Berurin Nihongo Hoshū Jugyō Kō) – Charlottenburg-Wilmersdorf, Berlin
  - Zentrale Schule fur Japanisch Berlin e.V. (共益法人ベルリン中央学園補習授業校 Kyōeki Hōjin Berurin Chūō Gakuen Hoshū Jugyō Kō) – Wilmersdorf, Berlin – Established April 1997.
  - Japanische Schule Bonn e.V. (ボン日本語補習授業校 Bon Nihongo Hoshū Jugyō Kō)
  - Japanisches Institut in Bremen (ブレーメン日本語補習授業校 Burēmen Nihongo Hoshū Jugyō Kō)
  - Japanische Schule Köln e.V. (ケルン日本語補習授業校 Kerun Nihongo Hoshū Jugyō Kō) – Kalk, Cologne
  - Japanische Ergänzungsschule in Dresden (ドレスデン日本語補習校 Doresuden Nihongo Hoshūkō)
  - Japanische Ergänzungsschule in Düsseldorf
  - Forderschule fur Japankunde in Düsseldorf e.V.
  - Japanisches Institut Frankfurt am Main (フランクフルト補習学校 Furankufuruto Hoshū Jugyō Kō)
  - Japanisches Institut Hamburg (ハンブルグ補習授業校 Hanburugu Hoshū Jugyō Kō) – Halstenbek
  - Japanische Ergänzungsschule Heidelberg e.V. (ハイデルベルク日本語授業補習校 Haideruberugu Nihongo Hoshū Jugyō Kō)
  - Japanisches Institut in München e.V. (JIM; ミュンヘン日本語補習授業校 Myunhen Nihongo Hoshū Jugyō Kō) – Munich
  - Japanische Kulturvereinigung in Nurnberg e.V. (ニュンベルグ補習授業校 Nyunberugu Hoshū Jugyō Kō) – Nuremberg
  - Japanische Schule Stuttgart e.V. (シュツットガルト日本語補習授業校 Shutsuttogaruto Nihongo Hoshū Jugyō Kō)
- Hungary
  - Midorino Oka japán kiegészitö iskola (みどりの丘日本語補習校 Midori no Oka Nihongo Hoshūkō or ブダペスト補習授業校 Budapesuto Hoshū Jugyō Kō) – held at Törökvész Általános Iskola, Budapest
- Republic of Ireland
  - Saturday School for Japanese Children in Dublin (ダブリン補習授業校 Daburin Hoshū Jugyō Kō)
- Italy
  - Scuola Giapponese di Firenze (フィレンツェ日本語補習校 Firentse Nihongo Hoshūkō) – Florence
  - Milan Hoshuko (ミラノ補習授業校 Mirano Hoshū Jugyō Kō) – Milan
  - The Japanese Weekend School of Rome (ローマ日本語補習授業校 Rōma Hoshū Jugyō Kō) – at the Scuola Giapponese di Roma, Rome
  - Associazione Cultura Giapponese di Torino (トリノ補習授業校 Torino Hoshū Jugyō Kō) – Turin
- Luxembourg
  - The Japanese Supplementary School in Luxembourg (ルクセンブルグ補習授業校 Rukusenburugu Hoshū Jugyō Kō)
- Netherlands
  - Japanese Saturday School Amsterdam (JSSA; アムステルダム日本語補習授業校 Amusuterdamu Nihongo Hoshū Jugyō Kō)
  - Stiching Maastricht Japanese Supplementary School (マーストリヒト日本語補習授業校 Māsutorihito Nihongo Hoshū Jugyō Kō)
  - The Hague-Rotterdam Japanese Saturday School (ハーグ・ロッテルダム日本語補習授業校 Hāgu Rotterudamu Nihongo Hoshū Jugyō Kō) – Rotterdam, serving The Hague
    - It was formed in 1996 by the merger of existing Saturday schools in The Hague and Rotterdam.
  - Stiching the Japanese School of Tilburg (ティルブルグ日本語補習授業校 Tiruburugu Nihongo Hoshū Jugyō Kō) – Classes at Beatrix College. – Classes formerly at 2College.
- Norway
  - Japanese Supplementary School at Oslo (オスロ補習授業校 Osuro Hoshū Jugyō Kō)
- Portugal
  - Escola Japonesa em Lisboa – Lisbon (リスボン日本語補習授業校 Risubon Nihongo Hoshū Jugyō Kō)
  - Escola Japonesa No Porto (ポルト補習授業校 Poruto Hoshū Jugyō Kō)
- Russia
  - St.Petersburg Japanese Language School (サンクトペテルブルク補習授業校 Sankutopeteruburugu Hoshū Jugyō Kō)
- Spain
  - Hoshuko Barcelona Educación Japonesa/Escuela de Educación Japonesa en Barcelona (バルセロナ補習校 Baruserona Hoshūkō) – Sant Cugat del Valles
  - La Escuela Complementaria Japonesa de Madrid
- Sweden
  - Japanese School in Gothenburg (ヨーテボリ日本人補習校 Yōtebori Nihonjin Hoshūkō; Swedish: Japanska Skolan i Göteborg)
- Switzerland
  - Japanese School in Zurich Hoshuko – Uster
- United Kingdom
  - Japanese School in Wales (ウェールズ補習授業校 Wēruzu Hoshū Jugyō Kō) – Cardiff
  - Kent Japanese School (ケント日本語補習校 Kento Nihongo Hoshū Jugyō Kō) – Located in Canterbury – Its time of establishment is August 2005
  - Manchester Japanese School (マンチェスター日本人補習授業校 Manchesutā Nihonjin Hoshū Jugyō Kō) – Lymm, Warrington, Cheshire
  - Yorkshire and Humberside Japanese School (ヨークシャーハンバーサイド日本語補習校 Yōkushā Hanbāsaido Nihongo Hoshūkō) – Leeds
  - The Scotland Japanese School (スコットランド日本語補習授業校 Sukottorando Nihongo Hoshū Jugyō Kō) – Livingston (near Edinburgh), established in 1982
  - Telford Japanese School (テルフォード補習授業校 Terufōdo Hoshū Jugyō Kō) – Stirchley, Telford
  - North East of England Japanese Saturday School (北東イングランド補習授業校 Hokutō Ingurando Hoshū Jugyō Kō) – Oxclose, Tyne and Wear (near Newcastle-upon-Tyne)

== Latin America ==
Locations of hoshū jugyō kō in North America excluding the lower 48 states of the United States and the District of Columbia (those of blue dots have teachers sent from Japan while those of green dots do not – those of red dots have teachers from Japan and are clickable – orange dots do not have teachers from Japan, but are clickable)
Locations of hoshū jugyō kō in South America (green dots are not clickable while orange ones are clickable – note that none have teachers sent by MEXT)

With teachers from Japan:

- Mexico
  - Colegio Japones de Guadalajara A.C. (グアダラハラ補習授業校 Guadarahara Hoshū Jugyō Kō) – Held at Secundaria y Preparatoria Femenil Colinas de San Jaier, Zapopan, Jalisco in the Guadalajara Metropolitan Area. Formerly had its classes held at the Escuela Primaria "Antonio Caso" in Guadalajara.

Without teachers from Japan:

- Bolivia
  - Curso Suplementario del Idioma Japones (ラパス補習授業校 Rapasu Hoshū Jugyō Kō) – La Paz
- Brazil
  - Escola Suplementar Japonesa Curitiba (クリチバ補習授業校 Kurichiba Hoshū Jugyō Kō)
- Dominican Republic
  - Colegio Japones de Santo Domingo (サント・ドミンゴ補習授業校 Santo Domingo Hoshū Jugyō Kō)
- Ecuador
  - Guayaquil Hoshuko (グアヤキル補習授業校 Guayakiru Hoshū Jugyō Kō)
  - Colegio Japonés Auxiliar de Quito – Quito
- El Salvador
  - Escuela Japonesa en San Salvador
- Honduras
  - Escuela Complemetaria del Idioma Japonesa en Tegucigalpa (デグシガルパ補習授業校 Tegushigarupa Hoshū Jugyō Kō)
- Mexico
  - Asociacion Regiomontana de Lengua Japonesa A.C. (モンテレー補習授業校 Monterē Hoshū Jugyō Kō) – Garza Garcia, Nuevo Leon (Monterrey Metropolitan Area)
    - Previously it was based in Apodaca.

== Middle East ==
Locations of hoshū jugyō kō in the Middle East and North Africa (those of blue dots have teachers sent from Japan while those of green dots do not)

With teachers from Japan:

- Oman
  - Japanese School in Oman (オマーン補習授業校 Omān Hoshū Jugyō Kō; Arabic: المدرسة اليابانية) – Muscat
    - It was established in 1986 (Shōwa 58). Initially it was held in a room in the Japanese Embassy in Muscat. Previously it was held in a property in Medinat Qaboos. In 2010 the school song was established. In 2013 the school moved to a new location for the first time since 1986.

Without teachers from Japan:

- Kuwait
  - Japanese Supplement School in Kuwait (クウェート補習授業校 Kuwēto Hoshū Jugyō Kō), also known as Kuwait Nihonjin Hoshu-Shogakko
- Jordan
  - Japanese Supplementary School in Jordan (アンマン補習授業校 Anman Hoshū Jugyō Kō) – Amman
- Saudi Arabia
  - Dhahran Japanese School (ダハラン補習授業校 Daharan Hoshū Jugyō Kō)
- Syria
  - The Japanese Language School in Damascus (ダマスカス補習授業校 Damasukasu Hoshū Jugyō Kō)
- Turkey
  - The Japanese Saturday School in Istanbul (イスタンブル補習授業校 Isutanburu Hoshū Jugyō Kō)

== North America ==
Locations of hoshū jugyō kō in the lower 48 United States (those of blue dots have teachers sent from Japan while those of green dots do not – those of red dots have teachers from Japan and are clickable – orange dots do not have teachers from Japan, but are clickable) – Note: Alaska is represented on the North America map, and Hawaii, Guam, and the Northern Mariana Islands are represented on the Oceania map

=== Canada ===
With teachers from Japan:

- Toronto Japanese School
- Vancouver Japanese School (バンクーバー補習授業校, Bankūbā Hoshū Jugyō Kō) – Established on April 7, 1973 (Shōwa Year 48).

Without teachers from Japan:

- Alberta
  - Calgary Hoshuko Japanese School Association (カルガリー補習授業校 Karugarī Hoshū Jugyō Kō)
  - Metro Edmonton Japanese Community School (MEJCS; エドモントン補習校 Edomonton Hoshūkō)
- Nova Scotia
  - Japanese School of Halifax (ハリファックス補習授業校 Harifakkusu Hoshū Jugyō Kō)
- Ontario
  - London (CA) Japanese School (ロンドン（CA）補習授業校 Rondon Hoshū Jugyō Kō)
  - The Ottawa Hoshuko (オタワ補習校 Otawa Hoshūkō)
- Quebec
  - Montreal Hoshuko School
- Saskatchewan
  - Saskatoon Japanese Language School (サスカトーン補習授業校 Sasukatōn Hoshū Jugyō Kō)

=== United States ===
With teachers from Japan:

- California
  - Asahi Gakuen – Office in Los Angeles, classes in the Los Angeles metropolitan area
  - Minato School – San Diego
  - San Francisco Japanese School, office in San Francisco and classes in San Francisco, San Jose, and Cupertino
- District of Columbia
  - See Maryland
- Florida
  - Miami Hoshuko – Classes in Westchester, office in Doral (Greater Miami)
- Georgia
  - Georgia Japanese School (ジョージア日本語学校 Jōjia Nihongo Gakkō/アトランタ補習授業校 Atoranta Hoshū Jugyō Kō) – Mableton (Greater Atlanta)
    - In 1986 it had 320 students.
- Hawaii
  - The Hawaii Japanese School – Rainbow Gakuen (ハワイレインボー学園 Hawai Rainbō Gakuen) – Honolulu
- Illinois
  - Chicago Futabakai Japanese School Weekend School – Arlington Heights near Chicago)
- Indiana
  - Indiana Japanese Language School – Indianapolis
- Kentucky
  - Japanese Language School of Greater Cincinnati – Highland Heights - Held at Northern Kentucky University
  - Central Kentucky Japanese School (CKJS: セントラルケンタッキー日本人補習校 Sentoraru Kentakkī Nihonjin Hoshūkō) – Lexington
    - Its scheduled opening was in September 1986, and it opened November of that year, making it the first Kentucky hoshuko to open. Its scheduled classroom location was Tates Creek School, where it remained until the mid-2000s. It opened because Japanese employees at the Toyota office in the region asked for a hoshuko. In 2005 the Fayette County School District's board of education agreed to establish a $2 million dedicated building on the Edythe J. Hayes Middle School property for the hoshuko. All board members voted in favor of the move. In 2006, 300 students were enrolled.
- Maryland
  - Washington Japanese Language School (ワシントン日本語学校 Washinton Nihongo Gakkō) – Office in North Bethesda, adjacent to Garrett Park – Classes at Stone Ridge School of the Sacred Heart in Bethesda.
    - Established 1958, its initial enrollment was 50 and at first it was held at the Embassy of Japan in the United States, with its classroom space held within the basement level. By 1983, there were 400 students, with 95% of them being Japanese citizens, and all but two having Japanese ethnicity. The parents of most students were on non-immigrant visas, and worked in business, in the journalism trade, or at the embassy. In 1983 the school only accepted students who have sufficient fluency in the Japanese language. At that time it was held at the Georgetown Preparatory School in North Bethesda. By 2003 its office was at Quinn Hall of Holy Cross Church in North Bethesda, and it had classes held at Holy Cross Church Elementary School, St. Luke Catholic School in McLean, Virginia, and Georgetown Prep.
- Massachusetts
  - Greater Boston Japanese Language School (ボストン補習授業校 Bosuton Hoshū Jugyō Kō) – Classes in Medford, office in Arlington (Greater Boston)
    - It began circa 1975, and from that point it was held at Medford High School. In 1995 it had 460 students and had a principal appointed by the Japanese government.
- Michigan
  - Battle Creek Japanese School (バトルクリーク補習授業校 Batoru Kurīku Hoshū Jugyō Kō) – Battle Creek
    - In 1997 the school had 125 students and 11 teachers. Most of the students lived in the Battle Creek area, and some students came from Indiana. The enrollment was the same in 1998, and then it held classes at Territorial Elementary School of the Lakeview School District. It, in 2007 it had 150 students.
  - Japanese School of Detroit – Novi (Greater Detroit)
- New Jersey
  - Japanese Weekend School of New Jersey (ニュージャージー補習授業校 Nyūjājī Hoshū Jugyō Kō), classes in Paramus and offices in Fort Lee (New York City metropolitan area)
    - The school previously used parents as teachers, with them acting in a volunteer capacity, but by 1994 it switched to using paid teachers and collected tuition from parents, about $1,000 every four months. In the 1990s its classes were held at different campuses: C, H, J, and N. N only held elementary classes while J held only secondary classes. The first, second, and fourth campuses were in Clifton, Hackensack, and Fort Lee, respectively. By 1994, due to a decline in the Japanese economy, the weekend school was not getting as many students as it used to.
  - Princeton Community Japanese Language School (classes in Lawrence Township, Mercer County, offices in Princeton except on Sundays, when the offices are in Lawrence Township)
- New York
  - Japanese Weekend School of New York, offices in New Rochelle, New York, classes in Queens, New York City and Port Chester, New York.
- North Carolina
  - The Japanese Language School in Charlotte (シャーロット日本語補習学校 Shārotto Nihongo Hoshūgakkō) – Charlotte
    - It was established circa 1980. In 1984 it was held at Myers Park Elementary School, and its enrollment was 61.
  - Japanese Language School of Raleigh Inc. (ローリー日本語補習学校 Rōrī Nihongo Hoshūgakkō) – Raleigh
- Ohio
  - Columbus Japanese Language School – Classes in Columbus, office in Worthington
  - Western Ohio Japanese Language School (オハイオ西部日本語学校 Ohaio Seibu Nihongo Gakkō) – Unincorporated Miami County, near Troy (Dayton metropolitan area) – Previously held in Vandalia
    - It was established in April 1988 with 37, and used the ex-Vandalia Elementary School facility. In 1990 there were nine teachers and 125 students. In 2004, the enrollment count was 190, from 125 different households. In fall 2004 it was scheduled to relocate to the ex-Miami East Junior High School.
  - For Greater Cincinnati, see Kentucky
- Oregon
  - Portland Japanese School – Offices in Beaverton, classes in Tualatin, both in the Portland, Oregon metropolitan area
- Pennsylvania
  - Japanese Language School of Philadelphia (JLSP, フィラデルフィア日本語補習授業校 Firaderufia Nihongo Hoshū Jugyō Kō) – Wynnewood, Lower Merion Township
    - It was established in 1972 In February 1999 enrollment was about 230. Kizo Saito, sent by the Japanese government, served as principal from 1996 to 1999. It had 250 students in November 1999. In 2007 it had about 230 students. It serves Japanese families in the Lehigh Valley area.
  - Pittsburgh Japanese School (ピッツバーグ日本語補習授業校 Pittsubāgu Nihongo Hoshū Jugyō Kō) – Fox Chapel (Greater Pittsburgh)
    - It was created by parents in 1977, although formal establishment had not happened yet. The school was previously in Squirrell Hill. In 1993 it was formally registered. It began holding classes at Fox Chapel Area High School that year. As of 1994 about 66% of the students were Japanese citizens, with half of those from academic and researcher families and the other half from businessperson families. In July 2006 it began holding classes at Shady Side Academy. In 2009 it had 12 teachers with 91 pupils.
- Tennessee
  - Japanese Supplementary School in Middle Tennessee (JSMT, 中部テネシー日本語補習校 Chūbu Teneshī Nihongo Hoshūkō) – Murfreesboro (Greater Nashville)
  - East Tennessee Japanese School (ETJS; イーストテネシー補習授業校 Īsuto Teneshī Hoshū Jugyō Kō) – Maryville College, Maryville (Greater Knoxville)
    - It opened in August 1989, as the Blount County (ブラントカウンティ) Japanese School, and has been held at Maryville College. In 1990 its enrollment was 15 and the school used Maryville students as volunteer instructors; according to Kumiko Franklin, the principal, there were 40 such volunteers applying for four positions. As of that year the school was hoping to hire Japan-based teachers.
- Texas
  - Japanese School of Dallas – Office in Dallas, classes at Ted Polk Middle School in Carrollton – Office was formerly in Farmers Branch.
  - Japanese Language Supplementary School of Houston – Houston
- Virginia
  - For the Washington, DC area, see Maryland. Previously the Washington Japanese Language School held classes in McLean, Virginia
- Washington
  - Seattle Japanese School – Bellevue

Without teachers from Japan:

- Alabama
  - Birmingham Supplementary School (バーミングハム補習授業校 Bāminguhamu Hoshū Jugyō Kō) – classes in Hoover, offices in Talladega County
  - Japanese Supplement School in Huntsville (ハンツビル補習授業校 Hantsubiru Hoshū Jugyō Kō) – Huntsville
- Alaska
  - Anchorage Japanese School (アンカレッジ補習授業校 Ankarejji Hoshū Jugyō Kō) (Anchorage)
- Arizona
  - Arizona Gakuen (アリゾナ学園) – Office in Tempe, classes in Mesa – Both are in the Phoenix Metropolitan Area
    - Classes were held at Mesa Community College in 1991, but that year the hoshuko was determining if it would lease six classrooms at Broadmoor Elementary School of the Tempe Elementary School District. Kelly Moeur, the principal, stated that the college had equipment unsuitable for younger students. In 1991 enrollment was 49, with the school supporting students aged 6–18 but with the eldest student being 13. All but nine of the students were Japanese citizens.
- Arkansas
  - Japanese School at Little Rock (リトルロック日本語補習校 Ritoru Rokku Nihongo Hoshūkō)
- California
  - Central Valley Japanese Supplementary School (セントラルバレー補習授業校 Sentoraru Barē Hoshū Jugyō Kō) – Clovis (Fresno metropolitan area)
  - Grossman Academy Japanese Language School (グロスマン・アカデミー Gurosuman Akademī) – Classes held in Palo Alto, office in Fremont, both in the San Francisco Bay Area
  - Port of Sacramento Japanese School (ポート･オブ･サクラメント補習授業校 Pōto Obu Sakuramento hoshū Jugyō Kō) – Classes in Sacramento, committee in Roseville
    - The school enrolled children of workers in Japanese companies like California Wood Fibre and NEC Electronics. In 1985 the school had 15 students. Shotaro F. Hayagashitani helped create the school and served as its principal.
  - MEXT does not list the Nishiyamato Academy Saturday School
- Colorado
  - Colorado Japanese School (コロラド日本語学校 Kororado Nihongo Gakkō) – Arvada, Denver Metropolitan Area
  - Japanese School of Denver (デンバー日本語補習校 Denbā Nihongo Hoshūkō) – Highlands Ranch, Denver Metropolitan Area
- Connecticut
  - Japanese School of Greater Hartford (ハートフォード日本語補習授業校 Hātofōdo Nihongo Hoshū Jugyō Kō) – Newington
    - Associated with the Japan Society of Connecticut, it began in 1989 with an initial enrollment of 16, making it Connecticut's first hoshuko. It was hosted at Conard High School. In 1991 the school had 27, with West Hartford being the home of six of them.
- Florida
  - Orlando Hoshuko
- Georgia
  - Japanese Saturday School of Columbus (コンパス（GA）補習授業校 Koronbasu (GA) Hoshū Jugyō Kō) – Columbus
- Illinois
  - Bloomington/Normal Japanese Saturday School (ブルーミントン・ノーマル補習授業校 Burūminton Nōmaru Hoshū Jugyō Kō) – Normal, serving Bloomington – Held at the Thomas Metcalf Laboratory School at Illinois State University, office in Normal
    - It was established in October 1986 to serve Japanese employees of a Diamond-Star Motors factory, which later became managed by Mitsubishi Motors. The school's initial enrollment was 12 and its peak enrollment was below 100 in the early 1990s. In 2006 the school had an average of 50 pupils. In 2005, Ken Ota became the principal.
- Indiana
  - Southern Indiana Japanese School (SJIS; 南インディアナ補習授業校 Minami Indiana Hoshū Jugyō Kō) – Evansville Founded on September 16, 1997.
    - The University of Southern Indiana (USI) created the school, which opened due to area Japanese companies wanting a weekend school. Initially it was held at Evansville Day School. In 2011 its teacher count was 11 and student count was 55. As of 2016 it holds classes at Nativity Catholic Church. In 2016 it had 55 students and 11 teachers. As of 2008 USI employs the principal and teachers, and the students live in Indiana, Kentucky, and Illinois. The school holds a festival each year.
  - IPFW Japanese Saturday School (フォートウェイン補習授業校 Fōtowein Hoshū Jugyō Kō) – Fort Wayne
  - Greater Louisville Regional Japanese Saturday School (グレータールイビル日本語補習校 Gurētā Ruibiru Nihongo Hoshūkō) – New Albany – Established in January 1988, affiliated with Indiana University Southeast's Japan Center
    - In 2006 classes met in Hillside Hall. The Japanese government and area Japanese businesses contributed funds for the school. Its 2006 enrollment was 49.
  - Richmond Japanese Language School (リッチモンド（IN）補習授業校 Ritchimondo(IN)Hoshū Jugyō Kō)
    - In 2006 the school had 34 students and held classes at Highland Heights Elementary School. In addition to Richmond, students live in places including Eaton, Greenville, and Portland. The Japanese school, in 2004, had asked the Richmond Community School Corporation if it could hold classes at Highland Heights.
- Iowa
  - Iowa City Japanese School (アイオワシティ補習授業校 Aiowa Shiti Hoshū Jugyō Kō)
    - Zion Lutheran Church is the classroom location. In 2005 the school had 15 students, with one Chinese student and one Korean student.
- Kansas
  - Kansas City Japanese School, Inc. (カンザスシティ日本語補習授業校 Kanzasu Shiti Nihongo Hoshū Jugyō Kō) – Overland Park, Kansas City metropolitan area – First established 1979, it was formally approved by the Japanese Ministry of Education (Monbusho) and officially established in 1984.
    - It was cofounded by Kei Watanabe, a parent who moved to the United States circa 1965 and chose to begin teaching her children Japanese. The school began in her residence, then in Johnson County, Kansas, in 1979. As of 1985 it had 11 students and four teachers, with two of the positions being funded by the Government of Japan and the other two being unpaid. At the time the school required that each student have at least one parent who was Japanese. At the time most of the instructors attended University of Missouri-Kansas City and the University of Kansas.
- Kentucky
  - Elizabethtown Japanese School (エリザベスタウン日本人補習校 Erizabesutaun Nihonjin Hoshūkō)
    - It began in 1987 and classes were held at Elizabethtown Community College. In 1997 there were 43 students, with 12 of them from Glasgow and some other students coming from Bardstown. The children's parents worked at five companies with operations in the region. A school bus was used to transport the Glasgow students.
  - For the Louisville Metropolitan Area see Indiana
- Louisiana
  - Baton Rouge Japanese School (バトンルージュ日本語補習校 Baton Rūju Nihongo Hoshūkō)
  - Japanese Weekend School of New Orleans (ニューオリンズ日本語補習校 Nyū Orinzu Nihongo Hoshūkō)
- Massachusetts
  - Amherst Japanese Language School (アーモスト補習授業校 Āmosuto Hoshū Jugyō Kō) – South Hadley
- Michigan
  - Grand Rapids Supplemental School (グランドラピッズ補習授業校 Gurando Rappizu Hoshū Jugyō Kō) – Ada Township
- Minnesota
  - Minnesota Japanese School – Richfield (Minneapolis-St. Paul)
  - Minneapolis Japanese School – Classes in Maplewood (Minneapolis-St. Paul)
- Mississippi
  - Japanese Supplementary School in Mississippi (ミシシッピ州日本語補習校 Mishishippi Nihongo Hoshūkō) – Jackson
    - It began operations in April 2003 with grade 2 and 3 students enrolled. Classes were held at the Wesley Biblical Seminary. Japan-America Society of Mississippi helped establish the school.
  - North Mississippi Japanese Supplementary School at The University of Mississippi (ノースミシシッピ日本語補習校 Nōsu Mishishippi Nihongo Hoshūkō) – Oxford
    - It opened in 2008, and was jointly established by several Japanese companies and the university. Many children have parents who are employees at Toyota facilities in Blue Springs, Mississippi.
- Missouri
  - St.Louis Japanese Language School for Children – Sverdrup Business/Technology Complex at Webster University, Webster Groves (Greater St. Louis)
  - For Greater Kansas City, see Kansas
- Nebraska
  - Omaha Japanese School (オマハ日本語補習授業校 Omaha Nihongo Hoshū Jugyō Kō)
- Nevada
  - Las Vegas Gakuen (ラスベガス学園) – Founded in September 1995
- New York
  - Buffalo Nihongo Club (バッファロー日本語補習校 Baffarō Nihongo Hoshūkō)
  - The Rochester Japanese School (RJS; ロチェスター日本語補習校 Rochesutā Nihongo Hoshūkō) – Pittsford
- Ohio
  - Japanese Language School of Cleveland (JLSC; クリーブランド日本語補習校 Kurīburando Nihongo Hoshūkō) – Laurel School, Shaker Heights, Ohio.
    - The school had a principal sent from Japan until 2001, but since then the principal has been United States-based. This is because when the Japanese government calculates whether a hoshuko has over 100 students and therefore is eligible for such assistance, the government does not include students in classes not oriented towards the Japanese curriculum, nor students who are not in compulsory education levels (as in kindergarten and senior high school). Therefore the Japanese government counted its enrollment as under 100 even though its total enrollment was above 100. This is the only hoshuko in Ohio where area companies do not defray the cost of tuition. In 2005 the school had 130 students. It was formerly held at Regina High School in South Euclid while the office was in Hudson. At one point the office moved to Twinsburg. At a later point the school was located at The Lillian and Betty Ratner School in Pepper Pike.
  - Japanese School of Toledo
- Pennsylvania
  - Central PA Nihongo Gakko or Central Penn Japanese School (セントラルペン日本語補習授業校 Sentoraru Pen Nihongo Hoshū Jugyō Kō) – State College
- South Carolina
  - Greenville Saturday School (GSS; グリーンビル日本語補習授業校 Gurīnbiru Nihongo Hoshū Jugyō Kō) – Wade Hampton (Greenville-Spartanburg)
    - The Greenville school was scheduled to open in 1989, with Greenville Technical College the proposed classroom location. The school received $2,500 from the city council of Greenville.
  - South Carolina Japanese Language Supplementary School (サウスカロライナ日本語補習校 Sausu Karoraina Nihongo Hoshūkō)/Matsuba Gakuen (松葉学園) – Columbia "Matsuba" means "Pine Needle"
    - In April 1985 the school was established. In 1989 its students were ages 3–16, and it was held on the campus of the University of South Carolina.
- Tennessee
  - Japanese Language School in Memphis (メンフィス日本語補習校 Menfisu Nihongo Hoshūkō)
- Texas
  - Austin Japanese School (オースチン日本語補習授業校 Ōsuchin Nihongo Hoshū Jugyō Kō)
    - The Japan America Society of Austin created the school. In 1987 the school had 19 students. At the time it was the only school in the Austin area that catered to a specific group from a national origin.
  - Japanese Supplementary School of El Paso (エルパソ日本語補習学校 Eru Paso Nihongo Hoshū Gakkō)
  - The Japanese Supplementary School of McAllen (マッカーレン日本語補習校 Makkāren Nihongo Hoshūkō)
  - Japanese Supplementary School of San Antonio (JSSSA; サンアントニオ日本語補習校 San Antonio Nihongo Hoshūkō)
- Virginia
  - Newport News Japanese School (NNJS; ニューポートニュース補習授業校 Nyūpōto Nyūsu Hoshū Jugyō Kō) – Established February 1988
  - Richmond Japanese School (リッチモンド（VA）補習授業校 Ritchimondo Hoshū Jugyō Kō) – Bon Air, Established 1988
- West Virginia
  - West Virginia International School (ウエストバージニア国際学校 Uesuto Bājinia Kokusai Gakkō) – Classes in Scott Depot in Teays Valley, office in Charleston
- Wisconsin
  - Madison Japanese Language School
- Guam
  - Japanese Language School – Mangilao, near Hagatna
- Northern Mariana Islands
  - Japanese Community School of Saipan (サイパン日本人補習校 Saipan Nihonjin Hoshūkō), Japanese Society of the Northern Marianas (北マリアナ日本人会) Educational Department – Classes on the second floor of the USL Building, Gualo Rai. Established on November 5, 1983 (Shōwa 58).

== Oceania ==
Locations of hoshū jugyō kō in Oceania (those of blue dots have teachers sent from Japan while those of green dots do not – those of red dots have teachers from Japan and are clickable – orange dots do not have teachers from Japan, but are clickable)

With teachers from Japan:

- Australia
  - The Japanese Language Supplementary School of Queensland – It consists of two schools: The Brisbane school has classes in Indooroopilly and offices in Taringa, and the Gold Coast school has classes in Merrimac and offices in Surfers Paradise
- New Zealand
  - Canterbury Japanese Supplementary School (カンタベリー日本語補習校 Kantaberī Nihongo Hoshūkō) – Ilam School, Ilam, Christchurch
- For Hawaii, see North America

Without teachers from Japan:

- Australia
  - Adelaide Japanese Community School, Inc. (ACJS; アデレード日本語補習授業校 Aderēdo Nihongo Hoshū Jugyō Kō) – Classes in Rose Park, South Australia
  - Cairns Japanese Language Tutorial Centre Inc. (CJLTC; ケアンズ日本語補習授業校 Keanzu Nihongo Hoshū Jugyō Kō), formerly Japanese Language Supplementary School of Cairns
    - It opened in April 1995, it is held at the Cairns Language Centre, and was formerly held at Cairns State High School.
  - Canberra Japanese Supplementary School Inc. – Classes in Deakin and offices in Yarralumla, in the Australian Capital Territory
  - Melbourne International School of Japanese
  - The Weekend Japanese School in Perth – City Beach, Western Australia
- New Caledonia (France)
  - École japonaise de la Nouvelle-Calédonie (ニューカレドニア日本語補習校 Nyū Karedonia Nihongo Hoshūkō) – Classes held at the Ecole Sacré-Cœur, Nouméa, operated by the Association Japonaise en Nouvelle-Calédonie (ニューカレドニア日本人会 Nyū Karedonia Nihonjinkai).
- New Zealand
  - Auckland Japanese Supplementary School (オークランド日本語補習学校 Ōkurando Nihongo Hoshūgakkō)
  - Japan-New Zealand Joint Venture School (ウェリントン補習授業校 Werinton Hoshū Jugyō Kō) – Crofton Downs, Wellington
- Palau
  - The Japanese Language School of Palau (パラオ補習授業校 Parao Hoshū Jugyō Kō) – Koror
- For Guam and Saipan see North America

Not designated by MEXT:

- Sydney Saturday School of Japanese (SSSJ; シドニー日本語土曜学校 Shidonī Nihongo Doyō Gakkō) – Cammeray
  - Held at Cammeray Public School in Cammeray, it was created on March 6, 1993. In April 1996 junior high school classes began.

== Former ==
Locations of closed hoshuko

Africa

- Senegal
  - Dakar
- Sudan
  - Khartoum
- Zambia
  - Lusaka Japanese School

Asia

- Brunei
  - The Japanese School in Brunei Darussalam – Bandar Seri Begawan
- China
  - Qingdao Qingdao is now served by the full-time Japanese School of Qingdao.
  - Suzhou – Held at the Suzhou Foreign Language School (苏州外国语学校) in Suzhou New District Suzhou is now served by the full-time Japanese School of Suzhou.
- India
  - Kolkata (Calcutta)
- Indonesia
  - Semarang
- Thailand
  - Sriracha – Sriracha-Pattaya Japanese Supplement School Sriracha is now served by the full-time Japanese School of Sriracha.

Europe

- Hungary
  - Budapest Japanese Supplementary School (Budapesti Japan Altalamos Iskola)
- Italy
  - Scuola giapponese di Veneto – Padua
- Spain
  - Escuela Complementaria Japonesa de Las Palmas

Middle East

- Yemen
  - Sana'a

North America

- United States
  - Alabama
    - Mobile Japanese School (モービル補習授業校 Mōbiru Hoshū Jugyō Kō)
    - Tuscaloosa Saturday School
      - It had 14 students in 1986. It was established to serve children of JVC employees in Alabama and was created in conjunction with the University of Alabama. According to JVC, the university's decision to support the school resulted in JVC choosing Tuscaloosa as the site of the JVC plant. The school used instructors from the university. Most of the students' families eventually planned to return to Japan.
  - Florida
    - Boca Raton Japanese School (ボカラトン補習授業校 Boka Raton Hoshū Jugyō Kō) (Miami metropolitan area)
  - Indiana
    - SBN Japanese School Inc. – Granger, and later Goshen in the South Bend metropolitan area
  - New Mexico
    - Albuquerque Japanese Language School (アルバカーキ補習授業校 Arubakāki Hoshū Jugyō Kō)
  - North Carolina
    - Piedmont Triad Japanese School (ピードモントトライアド補習中授業校 Pīdomonto Toraiado Hoshū Jugyō Kō) – Kernersville
      - It was scheduled to open in 1989. Its classroom location was to be East Forsyth High School in Kearnersville. Its anticipated enrollment was under 50. In May 1989 it had 52 students. The Winston-Salem/Forsyth County Schools, the board of commissioners of Forsyth County, and Deere-Hitachi co-sponsored the hoshuko.
  - Puerto Rico
    - Puerto Rico Japanese School (プエルトリコ補習授業校 Puerutoriko Hoshū Jugyō Kō) – Guaynabo – Closed March 2006
  - Virginia
    - Roanoke Japanese Saturday School (ロノアーク補習授業校 Ronōaku Hoshū Jugyō Kō) in Daleville – Closed indeterminately in April 2006, closed permanently February 2009
  - Washington
    - Japanese Supplementary School of Moses Lake (モーゼスレイク補習授業校 Mōzesu Reiku Hoshū Jugyō Kō)

There was also a hoshuko in Mansfield, Ohio, located at Ohio State University-Mansfield, in 1989.

Oceania

- Papua New Guinea
  - Port Moresby Japanese Language School (ポート・モレスビー補習授業校 Pōto Moresubī Hoshū Jugyō Kō) – Closed August 2009

South America

- Brazil
  - Porto Alegre
  - Salvador
