= Education in Montreal =

With access to six universities and twelve junior colleges in an 8 kilometre (5 mi) radius, Montreal, Quebec (Canada) has the highest proportion of post-secondary students of all major cities in North America. This represents roughly 248,000 post-secondary students, one of the largest numbers in the world.

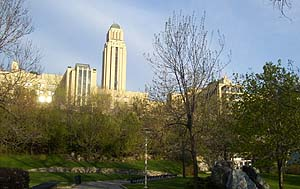
Université de Montréal

== Universities ==
=== Francophone ===
- Université de Montréal: (About 55,000 students)
  - École Polytechnique de Montréal
  - HEC Montréal - École des Hautes Études Commerciales de Montréal
- Université de Sherbrooke (Francophone; Located in Sherbrooke, campus in Longueuil)
- Université du Québec: (About 66,000 students)
- Université du Québec à Montréal (UQAM)
  - École de technologie supérieure (ETS)
  - École nationale d'administration publique (ENAP)
  - Institut National de la Recherche Scientifique (INRS)

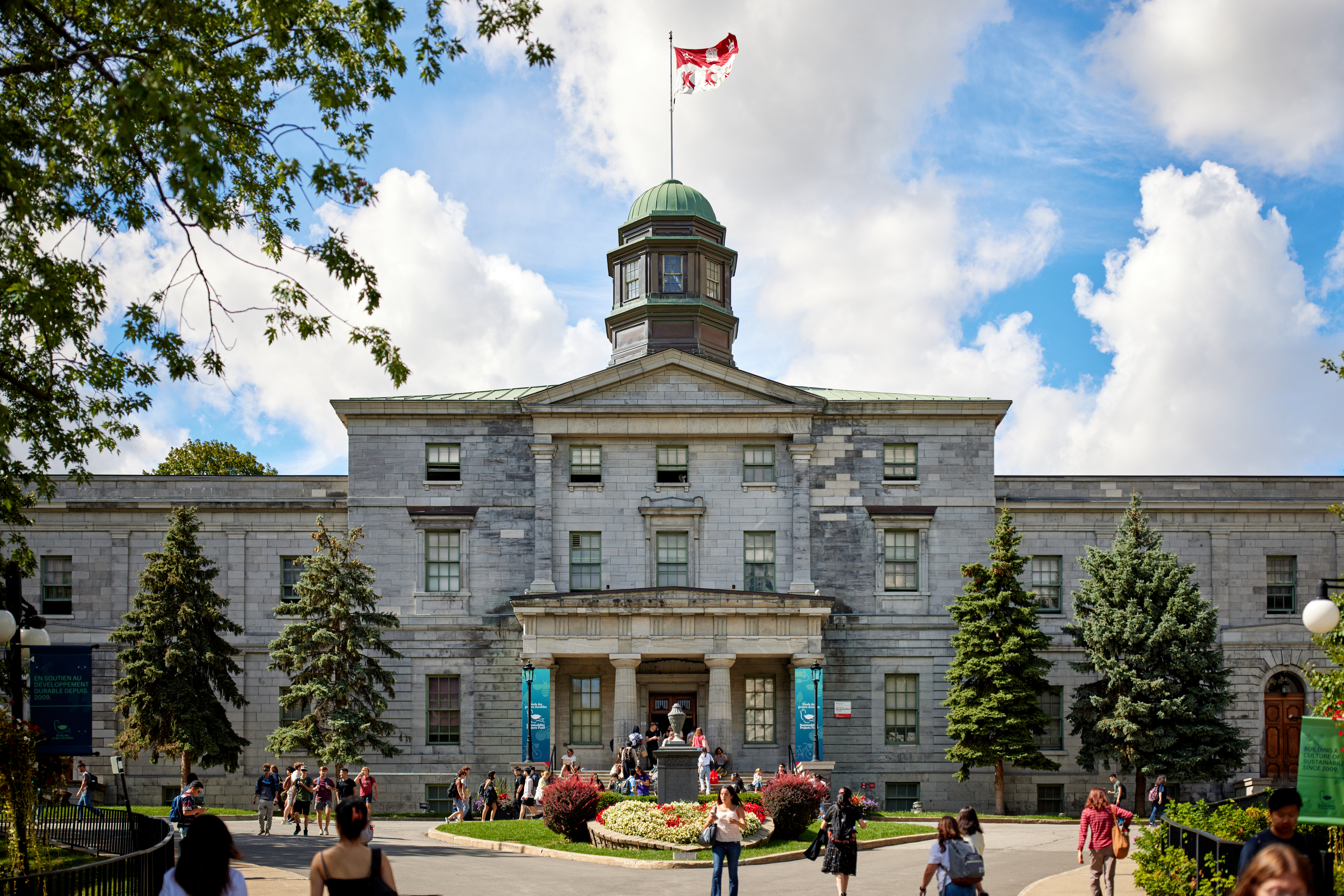
McGill University

=== Anglophone ===
- Concordia University: (About 44,000 students)
  - Loyola Campus (Notre-Dame-de-Grâce)
  - Sir George Williams Campus (Downtown Montreal)
- McGill University: (About 32,000 students)
  - Downtown Campus (Downtown Montreal)
  - Macdonald Campus (West Island)

== College ==
High school graduates who wish to go on to university must first complete two years of college. As an alternative, some students spend two years in American prep schoo.)

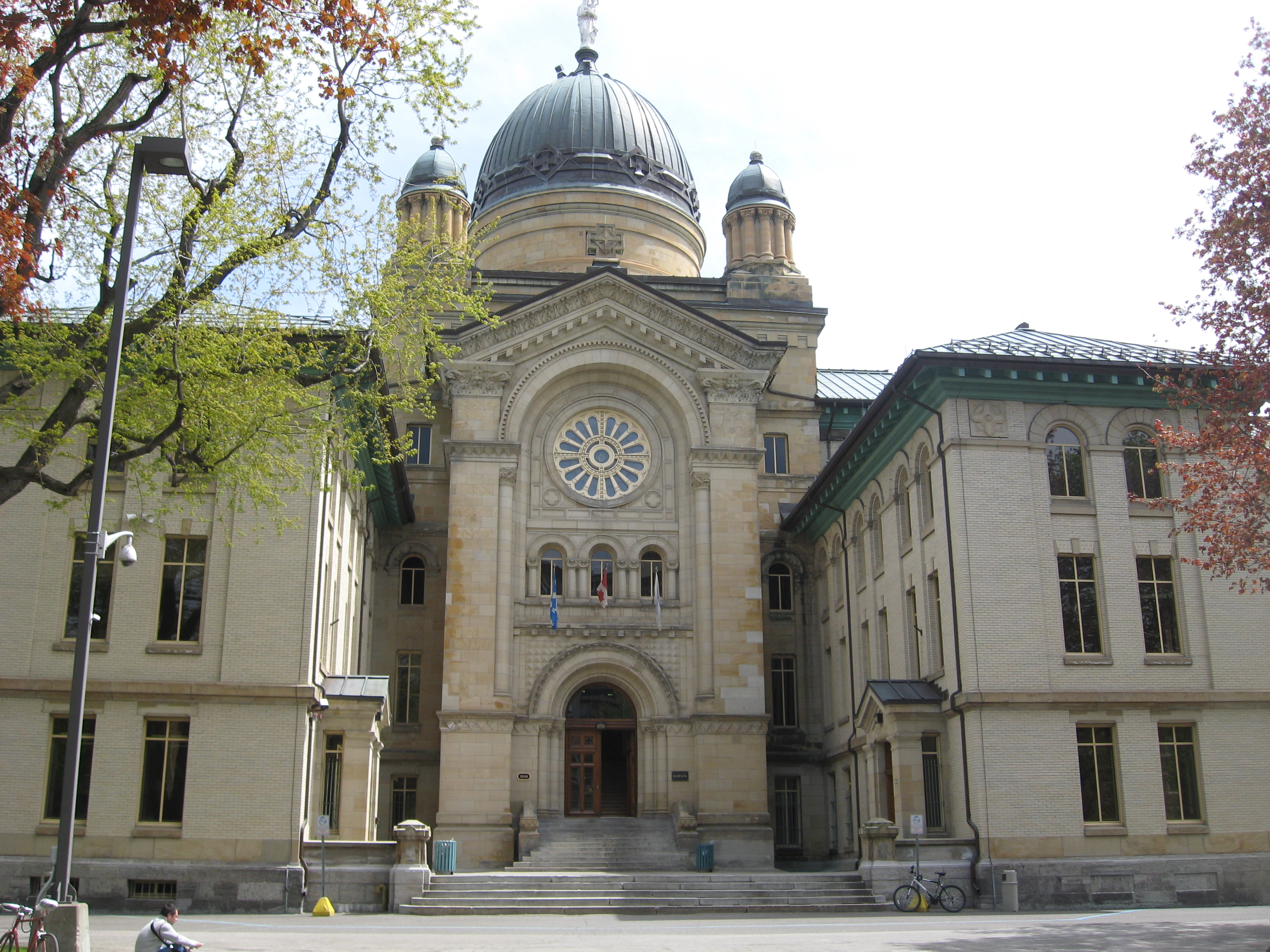
Dawson College

- English language Public Colleges
  - Champlain Regional College (2,500 students at St. Lambert Campus)
  - Dawson College (10,000 students)
  - John Abbott College (7,400 students)
  - Vanier College (6,100 students)
- French language Public Colleges
  - Collège Ahuntsic (10,100 students)
  - Cégep André-Laurendeau (2,700 students)
  - Collège de Bois-de-Boulogne (2,600 students)
  - Collège Édouard-Montpetit (6,700 students in Longueuil)
  - Collège Gérald-Godin (1,100 students)
  - Collège de Maisonneuve (5,600 students)
  - Collège Montmorency (5,800 students in Laval)
  - Cégep Marie-Victorin
  - Collège Notre-Dame du Sacré-Cœur (1,700 students)
  - Collège de Rosemont (2,800 students)
  - Cégep de Saint-Laurent (3,000 students)
  - Cégep du Vieux Montréal (9,000 students)
- Private Colleges
  - Marianopolis College (2,100 students)
  - Collège André-Grasset
  - Collège M of Canada
  - Collégial international Sainte-Anne
  - Collège Jean-de-Brébeuf (2,400 students)
  - LaSalle College
  - Herzing College
  - Delta College
  - TAV College

== Primary and secondary schools ==
Currently 17 school districts are secular and based on linguistic communities:

- Centre de services scolaire de Montréal (5)
- Centre de services scolaire Marguerite-Bourgeoys (5)
- Centre de services scolaire de la Pointe-de-l'Île (5)
- English Montreal School Board (1)
- Lester B. Pearson School Board (1)

Prior to 1998 school districts were formed on religious lines, with the school boards having both Francophone and Anglophone schools:

- Montreal Catholic School Commission
- Protestant School Board of Greater Montreal
- Commission scolaire Jérôme-Le Royer

Montreal also has French-language and English-language private schools. Anglophone private schools receiving subsidies from the provincial government must abide by the French Language Charter and restrict enrollment of students to eligible parties.

== Miscellaneous education ==
The Montreal Hoshuko School, a Japanese language supplemental school, holds its classes at the Trafalgar School for Girls.

The Chinese language supplemental school JiaHua School of Montreal (French: École JiaHua de Montréal, simplified Chinese: 佳华学校; traditional Chinese: 佳華學校; pinyin: Jiā Huá Xuéxiào) operates in Montreal. As of 2004 it has 800 students, who attend francophone and anglophone day schools, and 51 teachers. It offers mathematics, French, and English remedial classes in addition to Chinese classes. Most of the teachers are parents who have university degrees; they volunteer at the school.

== See also ==
- Education in Quebec
- Education in Canada
