= Japanese in Montreal =

Japanese Canadian community

Montreal has a Japanese Canadian community which was established during World War II as the Canadian government forced ethnic Japanese to leave Canada's West Coast. This community increased in the post-war period as Japanese persons wished to re-establish themselves in a new city.

== History ==
In 1942 the Canadian government forced ethnic Japanese to move from areas on the West Coast of Canada, so many moved to Montreal. The authors of "The Chameleon Character of Multilingual Literacy Portraits: Researching in "Heritage" Language Places and Spaces" stated that in the immediate post-World War II period, the Japanese in Montreal had a "long invisible presence". Reiko Yoshida, the author of the PhD thesis "Political economy, transnationalism, and identity : students at the Montreal Hoshuko," interviewed a Japanese Canadian at the Montreal Japanese Canadian Cultural Centre; according to the interview many Japanese arrived in Montreal since they could get a fresh start and not stand out.

Due to requests from Japanese national parents, the Montreal Hoshuko School opened in 1972. The Japanese population increased in the 1970s. The opening of two Japanese schools, including Montreal Hoshuko, and economic expansion in both Japan and Montreal contributed to the expansion of the Japanese population.

== Geographic distribution ==
As of 2003 there was no particular place where ethnic Japanese were concentrated. E. Bourgault wrote in Perspectives on the Japanese Canadian Experience in Quebec (Repartir a Zero; Perspectives sur/ L’Experience des Canadiens d’Origine Japonaise au Quebec) that Japanese in Montreal historically "lived relatively anonymously" and that they "have avoided visible concentration as a collective, hoping to blend in, unnoticed into the larger population."

== Demographics ==
Tomoko Makebe stated in The Canadian Sansei that the 1991 Canadian Census indicated that 2,360 Japanese Canadians resided in Montreal. This figure remained constant, around 2,000, as of the 2011 Census. As of 2003 the Japanese community of Montreal was smaller than that of the city's Armenian and Chinese communities, and as of 2014 the ethnic Japanese make up less than 1% of the city's population.

According to the 2011 Census, 510 of the Japanese people in Montreal spoke Japanese at home and a total of 1,280 indicated that Japanese was their native language, meaning that more than 50% of the total number of ethnic Japanese in Montreal do not speak Japanese at home. Dr. Alison Crump, author of the PhD thesis "'But your face, it looks like you’re English': LangCrit and the experiences of multilingual Japanese-Canadian children in Montréal," noted that these Census figures should be interpreted as estimates since the data do not indicate whether racially mixed children with one Japanese parent are counted in the figures. She noted that many Japanese in the city are in relationships with non-Japanese, which could contribute to the low percentage of individuals who reported speaking Japanese at home.

As of 2014 Japanese nationals who study and/or work in Montreal and recent immigrants to Canada make up large portions of ethnic Japanese in the city. Many of the recent immigrants have married Canadian persons.

== Institutions ==
The various Japanese organizations in Montreal provide cohesion for the Japanese community.

Japanese Canadian Cultural Centre of Montreal (JCCCM; Centre Culturel Canadian Japonais de Montreal, モントリオール日系文化会館 Montoriōru Nikkei Bunka Kaikan), serves as a meeting centre for ethnic Japanese and other persons, a Japanese-language library, and offers kodomo-kai (child playgroups), ikebana (flower arrangement) classes, and Japanese as a second language classes. It was established in 1975. Every August the organization conducts the Matsuri Japon ("Japan Festival"). The Japanese Canadian History and Archives Committee (JCHAC) is a part of the JCCCM and began actively preserving the history of the community in both Montreal and Canada in 1982.

== Education ==
There are two supplementary Japanese schools in Montreal: the Montreal Japanese Language Centre (MJLC; Centre de la langue Japonaise de Montréal; モントリオール日本語センター Montoriōru Nihongo Sentā), and the Montreal Hoshuko School Inc.; the Japanese Ministry of Education designates the latter as a hoshū jugyō kō, a supplementary school for Japanese expatriates.

The Montreal Hoshuko, established in 1972, serves both Japanese nationals and Japanese Canadians, and its classes are held at the Trafalgar School for Girls.

Japanese parents established the MJLC in 1976, and it is held at the Collège Notre-Dame. The JLC offers a Japanese school year-based trimester Japanese program for children aged three and older, as well as Japanese classes for adults and children who are learning it as a second language.

== See also ==
- Japanese in Toronto
