= École Japonaise Complémentaire de Genève =

School in Geneva, Switzerland

Coordinates: 46.1999298°N 6.1358342°E

École Japonaise Complémentaire de Genève (ジュネーブ日本語補習学校 Junēbu Nihongo Hoshū Gakkō) is a Japanese supplementary school held in Geneva, Switzerland.

The school holds classes on Tuesday through Saturday.

== See also ==
- Japanese School in Zurich (full time school for Japanese people near Zurich)
- Kumon Leysin Academy of Switzerland (full time overseas Japanese private school in Switzerland)
