= Ken Adachi =

Canadian writer (1929–1989)

Ken Adachi (1929 – February 9, 1989) was a Canadian writer and literary critic, who was associated with the Toronto Star's literary section from 1976 until his death.

Born to Japanese immigrants in Vancouver, British Columbia, Adachi was interned with his family at Slocan during World War II. Following the end of the war, Adachi became editor of the New Canadian, a Japanese Canadian newspaper formerly edited by Tommy Shoyama, and studied English literature at the University of Toronto. He subsequently taught at the University of Toronto from 1958 to 1971, and at the University of Maryland from 1964 to 1968.

He then joined the Toronto Star in 1972 as a copy editor, rising to become editor of the books section in 1976. That same year, he also published the book The Enemy That Never Was, a history of the Japanese Canadian community which was later hailed by Robert Fulford as the definitive book on Japanese history in Canada.

Adachi was fired from his position with the Star in 1981 after a plagiarism accusation, although he was soon rehired as a book reviewer and literary columnist. He remained associated with the Star until 1989, when he committed suicide after a second accusation that he had plagiarized three paragraphs from a 1982 book review in TIME. His widow Mary Adachi, remains active in Canadian literature as a book editor.

== Select works ==
- Adachi, Ken. (1976). The Enemy that Never was: A History of the Japanese Canadians. Toronto: McClelland and Stewart. ISBN 978-0-7710-0723-1

== See also ==
- Japanese in Toronto
