= Japanese Language School of Greater Hartford =

Supplementary Japanese school in Connecticut

The Japanese Language School of Greater Hartford
- ハートフォード日本語補習授業校
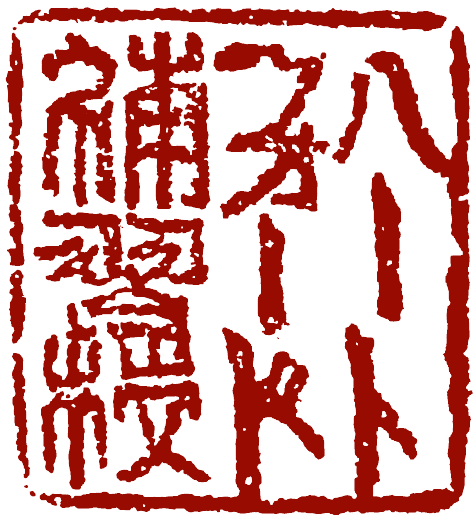
- West Hartford, Connecticut; United States

Information
- Other name: JLGH
- School type: Japanese language school
- Established: 1989-06-19
- Principal: Kazuaki Abe
- Age: 4 to 16
- Classes offered: Japanese, math, algebra
- Language: Japanese
- Hours in school day: 3
- Annual tuition: US$792.00
- Website: www.jlshartford.org
- Last updated: 2022-09-27

The Japanese Language School of Greater Hartford (JLGH; ハートフォード日本語補習授業校, Hātofōdo Nihongo Hoshū Jugyō Kō) is a supplementary Japanese language school located in the Greater Hartford area of Connecticut. It is Connecticut's oldest hoshū jugyō kō. The school has 74 students as of September 2022 and is recognized by MEXT for teaching a curriculum equivalent to that of schools in Japan for students at the same grade level.

It is operated with the cooperation of the parents and with the support of the Consulate General of Japan in Boston and the Japan Overseas Educational Services.

== History ==
=== Establishment ===
The school was established in 1989 by Japanese families who wanted an enjoyable learning environment for their children to learn Japanese. It began as an "exchange class", where volunteering parents taught the original 16 students. The school's initial goal was to create a class where Japanese children could learn Japanese while staying in America. In the year 1990, JLGH had 150 Japanese residents, including parents and teachers, attending the school. Due to high demand, the school allowed non-natives to take its language courses starting from 1993. However, the school does not offer Japanese as a Second Language (JSL) classes as of 2021, requiring students to be fluent in the Japanese language.

May 2019 marked its 30th anniversary since its establishment.

=== Tax Exemption ===
In the year 1990, the school was ruled to be an independent 501(c)(3) non-profit organization, and is thus exempt from federal income tax. JLGH states their mission as a non-profit to be an "operation of a Japanese language school for children." The organization has no full-time employees.

== Curriculum ==
The school meets every Saturday from 9:00 AM to 12:00 PM. The schedule consists of two periods of Japanese language and one period of mathematics. JLGH's curriculum aims to encourage and assist Japanese language learning at home. Seasonal events held at the school also aim to enrich the students' knowledge of Japanese culture and society. The Japanese Government provides textbooks free of charge to all students.

== Classes ==
The school offers classes for children aged 4 to 15 years old. Its class options range from kindergarten to junior high level classes. The school also offers Japanese classes for students who do not have Japanese as their first language. Similar to Japan, the school year begins in April and ends in March. The average school year is divided in three trimesters, with 40 total school days.

== See also ==
- List of hoshū jugyō kō
- Japanese language education in the United States
