= Education in Quebec =

Education in Canadian province

Education in Quebec is governed by the Ministry of Education and Higher Education (Ministère de l'Éducation et de l'Enseignement supérieur). It was administered at the local level by publicly elected French and English school boards, changed in 2020 to school service centres. Teachers are represented by province-wide unions that negotiate province-wide working conditions with local boards and the provincial government of Quebec.

== Preschool, primary and secondary education ==
- Optional preschool, also known as pre-kindergarten (prématernelle), is available for children that have attained 4 years of age on September 30 of the school year.
- Kindergarten (maternelle) is available province-wide for children that have attained 5 years of age on September 30 of the school year.
- Mandatory elementary education (école primaire) starts with grade 1 age 6 by September 30, through to grade 6 age 11 by September 30. Secondary school (école secondaire) has five grades, called secondary I–V (Sec I–V for short). Students are 12 to 17 years old (age of September 30), unless they repeat a grade (which is no longer allowed). Upon completion of secondary V, students receive their high school diploma from the provincial government.

=== Religion in schools ===
Formerly, school boards were divided between Roman Catholic and Protestant (called "confessional schools"). Attempts were made to set up a Jewish school board before the Second World War, but it failed partly due to divisions within the Jewish community. This confessional system was established through the British North America Act, 1867 (today the Constitution Act, 1867), which granted power over education to the provinces. Article 93 of the act made it unconstitutional for Quebec to change this system. Consequently, a constitutional amendment was required to operate what some see as the separation of the State and the church in Quebec.

The Quebec Education Act of 1988 provided for a change to linguistic school boards. In 1997, a unanimous vote by the National Assembly of Quebec allowed for Quebec to request that the Government of Canada exempt the province from Article 93 of the Constitution Act. This request was passed by the federal parliament, resulting in Royal Assent being granted to the Constitutional Amendment, 1997, (Quebec).

In the 1996–1997 school year, Quebec had 156 school districts including 135 Catholic districts, 18 Protestant school districts, and three First Nations districts. The school districts operated 2,670 public schools, including 1,895 primary schools, 576 general or professional secondary schools, and 199 combined primary and secondary schools.

When public schools were deconfessionalized in 2000, Catholic and Protestant religious education classes along with nonreligious moral education classes continued to be part of the curriculum. Article 5 of the Quebec Public Education Act had been modified in 1997 so as to allow minority religious groups to be allowed religious education classes of their faith where their number were large enough, but this was removed in 2000. Then, in order to prevent court challenges by these same minority religious groups wanting specialist religious education in schools, the government invoked the notwithstanding clause, which expires after a maximum of 5 years.

In 2005 the government of Premier Jean Charest decided not to renew the clause, abrogate Article 5 of the Public Education Act, modify Article 41 of the Quebec Charter of Rights and then eliminate the choice in moral and religious instruction that existed previously and, finally, impose a controversial new Ethics and religious culture curriculum to all schools, even the private ones. The ERC course has been taught starting in September 2008. Several court challenges have been launched against its compulsory nature.

As of 2019, School principals, vice principals, and teachers are banned from wearing religious symbols due to Bill 21

In 2020, it was reported that the Coalition Avenir Québec (CAQ) government was going to replace the project (Ethics and religious culture (ERC) with a new curriculum which would shift the focus from religion toward culture and citizenship. It would be replaced by 2024 with a new course, Culture et citoyenneté québécoise.

In April 2023, Bernard Drainville Quebec Minister of Education announced plans to ban prayer in all provincial public schools.

During the 2026 Quebec general election Parti Québécois (PQ) Leader Paul St-Pierre Plamondon proposed extending state secularism rules to bar elementary school students from wearing conspicuous religious symbols in the classroom.

=== Private schools ===
Quebec has the highest proportion of children going to private schools in North America. The phenomenon is not restricted to the well-to-do. Many middle- and lower-income families send their children to private schools. The government of Quebec gives a pro-rata subsidy for each child to any private school which meets its standards and follows its prescriptions, reducing tuition costs to approximately 30% of non-subsidized private schools.

Most of the private schools are secondary institutions, though there are a few primary schools, most of them serving precise religious or cultural groups such as Armenian Orthodox Christians or certain Jewish faiths.

Approximately 17% of the high school population of Quebec currently attends a private high school. The figure is even higher in urban centres such as Montreal, where 30% of high school students are in the private sector. A study released in August 2004 by the Quebec Ministry of Education revealed that, over the preceding five years, the private sector had grown by 12% while the public sector had shrunk 5.6%, with a slightly steeper rate in the last year.

Private secondary schools usually select their students by having them go through their own scholastic exams and by making a study of the entire primary school record.

The Quebec public sector teachers' unions oppose any form of subsidy to private schools. They claim (1) that private schools select only the brightest and most capable students and reject children with learning difficulties, and argue (2) that by doing this they leave a burden to the public sector. Private schools usually have teachers who are not unionized, or who belong to associations not affiliated with the main body of Quebec public sector teachers' unions. The debate over the subsidies has been going on for several decades.

=== Polyvalentes ===
A polyvalente (English: comprehensive) is a multi-functional secondary school specific to the Quebec school system. The difference between a polyvalente and a regular high school is that a polyvalente also contains a section dedicated to vocational training, in addition to general training. However, the term has not been officially used since February 10, 2001. It is preferable to use the term école secondaire (secondary school) for any type of institution where a high school education is offered, except for institutions already known as polyvalente. The first polyvalentes were created during the 1960s under the initiative of education minister Paul Gérin-Lajoie.

=== Language in schools ===
Quebec has publicly funded French and English schools. In publicly funded primary and secondary schools, according to the Charter of the French Language, all students must attend a French language school, except:

- students with a parent who did most of their elementary or secondary studies in English in Canada and is also a Canadian citizen
- students who have already done all or most of their elementary or secondary studies in English in Canada, or who have a sibling who has received most of their education in English in Canada, as long as a parent is a Canadian citizen.

Many attend publicly funded English schools. These rules do not apply to temporary residents of Quebec or First Nation children. If a parent had the right to attend English schools, but did not, they do not lose the right for their children.

English is taught as a second language in French primary schools from grade 1 onward, and a few schools also offer English immersion programs for advanced students. English schools offer a large range of programs that include French as a second language, French immersion, and fully bilingual programs that teach both English and French as first languages.

=== School service centres ===
The political party, Coalition Avenir Québec, passed Bill 40 on February 8, 2020. This expropriated the province's 60 French school boards, turning them into school service centres.

Bill 40 was passed to expropriate school boards that have been running in English style for 175 years. This did not include nine English school boards. But the move is seen as further undermining English-language education in the province. Bill 40 also does not affect the three Indigenous school boards under Canadian control in Quebec territory.

The abolishing of French school boards is said to save the government more than $10 million. Their reason for this is to try to improve the quality of education in Quebec.

=== French ===
The 60 Francophone school service centres are now to be run with five staff members, five parents and five members of the community.

=== English ===
On the other hand, English school board commissioners remain on the job until November 1, 2020, but they will then involve four staff members, four community representatives and between eight and seventeen parents.

The English school boards of Quebec invoked Article 23 of the Canadian Charter of Rights and Freedom, which is the official language minority education rights. They took legal action to get exempted from Bill 40.

== Post-secondary education ==
Students may pursue post-secondary education after completing compulsory schooling (elementary and secondary) in Quebec. Post-secondary education in Quebec includes two levels: college education and university education. Of note, the term 'post-secondary' in this entry is used specifically within the context of Quebec. Unique to Québec, this level is a bridge between compulsory schooling and university education. At the university level, education is provided by individual universities. These institutions have an education structure tantamount to that found elsewhere in North America.

=== Colleges ===
College education is given by institutions known as Colleges. Both private and public institutions (CEGEPs, which is officially coined in French as Collège d'enseignement général et professionnel) of this type exist within the province.

Unique to Québec, college education serves to bridge compulsory schooling and university education, since it is the only province that requires 11 years of study (instead of 12) to obtain a high school diploma. For admission purposes, Canadian provinces other than Quebec do not consider completion of grade 11 in Quebec (Sec V)—or, more simply, the secondary diploma of Quebec—to be sufficient for university admission (or admission at other post-secondary institutions). Hence, although some exceptions exist, successful completion of college education in Quebec is generally required to gain qualifications for university admission.

Students who enter college can specialize in a number of different technical or pre-university fields. The term of study is two years for pre-university and three years for most vocational or technical diplomas. Students completing college earn the Diplôme d'études collégiales sometimes with other designations attached to this title. Of interest, the term CEGEP can only legally be used to describe the state-run post-secondary (post-grade 11) schools, where tuition is free. The 26 private institutions which offer a post-secondary program recognized by the Quebec Ministry of Education receive a subsidy for each of their 15,000 students, and grant the same diplomas as the public colleges. Unlike the state-run colleges, the private post-secondary schools do not have to combine pre-university and vocational programs in one institution. About half offer pre-university and the other half offer vocational programs.

Holders of the two-year college diploma still must complete a minimum of three years of university education in order to obtain a bachelor's degree. Under Canadian law, bachelor's degrees from government-accredited universities in Canada are considered equal, whether from Quebec or other provinces. Those unfamiliar with Quebec may wonder if three-year university programs there are therefore equal to four-year university programs in other provinces, or in other countries where four-year first university degree programs are the norm. However, given that college diploma holders are granted up to one year of advanced standing credit at any university, it is clear that this is not the case. What exists in Quebec is simply a different structure of education than in other provinces, which ultimately yields exactly the same total duration of study when years of secondary and post-secondary study are combined.

Students who have completed a certain number of courses or graduated from a college program often receive up to one year of advanced standing at universities outside of Quebec, but no more than this. Effectively, the first year of college study is considered equivalent to grade twelve in all other provinces, while the second year is considered to be equal to the freshman university year. Chronologically and legally, this is true and has been in effect for the entire modern era of education in Canada.

=== Universities ===
Primary school, secondary school, and college add up to 13 years of pre-university study, one more than other provinces (although part of college study is post-secondary, as evidenced by the treatment of college diplomas in and outside of Quebec). For this reason, most undergraduate university degrees in Quebec universities are three years in length for Quebec students who have obtained a college diploma. Universities from outside Quebec have four-year bachelor's degree programs, because secondary study in all provinces outside of Quebec ends with grade 12 (rather than secondary study ending with grade 11 and then being followed by two years of college study, as in Quebec). University education in Quebec is much like in other North American jurisdictions. In addition to formerly private institutions, the government of Quebec founded a network of universities in several cities across the province, called the Université du Québec. All universities in the province have since become public in a similar fashion to other Canadian provinces.

From the standpoint of post-secondary institutions outside of Quebec who may be trying to determine transfer credit, there are essentially two ways in which to interpret the two-year college program, bolstered by local and countrywide legislation. The first option is to remove the first year of college study from consideration, since it is in fact the twelfth year of study overall in Quebec (similar to grade 12), and the laws of the land throughout Canada dictate that a high school diploma from Quebec lacks one additional year in order to be considered the equivalent of a high school diploma elsewhere. The second option would be to include both years of college study in the evaluation, knowing that the maximum of possible transfer credit/advanced standing is one year at the freshman level. This second option is viable if one is uncomfortable with using the chronological separation of year 12 and year 13 as their rationale, especially since college courses are not necessarily all taken in a predetermined chronological order, as the order can vary from student to student.

Quebec subsidizes post-secondary education and controls tuition fees, resulting in low student costs in university education. There are three levels of tuition: Quebec resident (lowest level), Out-of-province Canadian resident (tuition set to average Canadian tuition) and International tuition (highest). The Quebec resident tuition is only available to residents of Quebec, residents of jurisdictions that have bilateral agreements with the Quebec government, and to students enrolled in French literature or Quebec studies programs.

Greater Montreal has eleven universities, founded over the course of 200 years. In 2015, it had more than 155,000 students (full-time equivalent), or 65% of Quebec's student population.

== List of Quebec universities ==
=== French-language universities ===
- Université de Montréal
  - HEC Montréal
  - Polytechnique Montréal (affiliated)
- Université de Sherbrooke
- Université du Québec
  - École nationale d'administration publique (ENAP)
  - École de Technologie Supérieure (ETS)
  - Institut national de recherche scientifique (INRS)
  - Télé-université (TÉLUQ)
  - Université du Québec à Chicoutimi (UQAC)
  - Université du Québec à Montréal (UQAM)
  - Université du Québec à Rimouski (UQAR)
  - Université du Québec à Trois-Rivières (UQTR)
  - Université du Québec en Abitibi-Témiscamingue (UQAT)
  - Université du Québec en Outaouais (UQO)
- Université Laval

=== English-language universities ===
- Bishop's University
- Concordia University
- McGill University

== See also ==
- Education in Montreal
- Education in Canada
- List of schools in Quebec
