= Audax (grammarian) =

Roman grammarian

Audax is the name of a 5th/6th century grammarian. His work is cited in Saint Boniface's Ars Bonifacii.
