= Ars Bonifacii =

The Ars Bonifacii is the title given to a Latin grammar ascribed to Saint Boniface.

== Textual history ==
The text survives in three manuscripts.

1. The so-called Kaufunger Fragment, named for Kaufungen Abbey; this may have been copied in the south of England even during the saint's lifetime (he died in 754).
2. Biblioteca Apostolica Vaticana, Pal. Lat. 1746, a codex deriving from Lorsch, Hessen, consisting of a number of varied texts, including the Rule of St. Augustine and Isidore's Etymologiae, as well as another Anglo-Saxon grammar, by Tatwine.
3. Bibliothèque nationale Paris, Lat. 17959, a composite codex whose second part, containing the grammars by Boniface and Tatwine, is possibly from the abbey of Saint-Riquier.

The latter two date from the late eighth-early ninth centuries, and both also contain the grammar of Tatwine, though Vivien Law notes that the two did not share a transmission history and came to the two codices by different ways—Tatwine's likely from England to the court of Charlemagne, and Boniface's from the areas in Germany where Anglo-Saxon missionaries were active.

== Sources ==
The basic framework of Boniface's grammar derives from Aelius Donatus's Ars Maior, though his examples are drawn from elsewhere. It shares four sources with Tatwine's: Donatus, Priscian, Isidore, and Asporius. In addition, Boniface used Charisius, Phocas, Audax, Diomedes Grammaticus, Sergius (pseudo-Cassiodorus), Virgilius Maro Grammaticus, and Aldhelm to provide him with theory and examples.

Boniface's Latin was church Latin; it was used specifically to read scripture and liturgy, as well as commentary on scripture. However, in contrast with earlier grammars from the fourth and fifth centuries, his grammar is written for an audience that learned Latin as a foreign language. The Christian backdrop for such language learning also meant that Boniface and other grammarians at the time had to incorporate non-Latin terms and names (specifically, some Greek terminology and Hebrew names) in the Latin grammatical system. In general, Boniface's Latin was heavily influenced by Aldhelm; in 1931, Paul Lehmann even identified the grammar as having been written by Aldhelm.
