= Evansville Day School =

Private school in Evansville, Indiana, United States

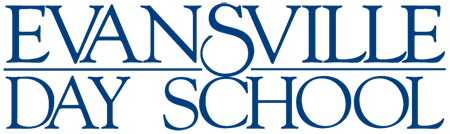

Location
- 3400 North Green River Road; Evansville, Indiana 47715; United States; 38.010606°N 87.495182°W

Information
- Type: Private, Day school
- Established: 1946
- Head of school: Sarah Jacobson
- Head of Primary School Head of Middle and Upper Schools: Kelly McCandless Holly Ziemer
- Grades: Jr. PreK–12
- Enrollment: 335
- Average class size: 10-15
- Student to teacher ratio: 8:1
- Hours in school day: 8 AM-3 PM
- Campus size: 40 acres
- Colors: Navy blue and Gold
- Slogan: Preparing For College. Preparing For Life.
- Athletics: IHSAA
- Athletics conference: Independent
- Mascot: Ed the Eagle
- Nickname: Eagles
- Accreditation: Indiana DOE; NAIS; ISACS; NCA
- Yearbook: Landmark
- Tuition: $4,700-$16,890
- Gym Capacity: 850
- Website: evansvilledayschool.org

Evansville Day School (EDS) is a private, Jr. PreK–12 college-preparatory school located in Evansville, Indiana in the United States. It is the only independent, coeducational day school in Evansville and the surrounding region. To accommodate a wide range of grade levels, the school is separated into three divisions: Primary School (Jr. PreK–4), Middle School (5–8), and Upper School (9–12).

Its head of school is Sarah Jacobson, and the heads of Primary and Middle School are Kelly McCandless and Holly Ziemer. Since Fall 2019, Day School has a house system, in which the four houses represent characteristics, a color, and an animal. These include the Heekin House, Baumgart House, Boettcher House, and the Igleheart House.

== Profile ==
EDS currently has about 300 students spread across the three divisions with roughly 80 high school students. Many of these students attend through the school's unique Merit Scholarship program, meaning they do not have to pay full tuition. Students begin Spanish instruction in pre-school and take French in 5th grade, offering early foreign language instruction. Student-teacher ratio is roughly 8:1 with classes averaging about ten to fifteen students. 100% of each EDS senior class attends college. Students primarily reside in Vanderburgh and Warrick counties along with members from Henderson, Kentucky and the surrounding Tri-State.

== History ==
Evansville Day School began in 1946 as the Episcopal Nursery School, enrolling seven students at St. Paul's Episcopal Church. The school was incorporated on June 10, 1949, as a not-for-profit coeducational school, serving students in the primary and secondary grades. The school relocated in 1952 to S.E. First Street, and was renamed Evansville Pre-School, with the addition of a kindergarten class. In February 1958, the school became Evansville Day School, added instruction for all primary school grades, educated 80 students, and established its new location in the former residence of the Austin S. Igleheart family at 800 Sunset Ave. In 1961, to accommodate the addition of high school classes, the school added a 4,000-square-foot classroom, library, and laboratory addition.

In 1965, the first high school graduating class advanced all of its 11 students to college. With enrollment in 1967 exceeding two hundred, the school initiated a capital campaign to raise $500,000 for a new facility. By 1968, EDS had opened the doors at its current location, 3400 N. Green River Road, with 216 students enrolled. By 1981, enrollment reached 300 students, taught by 35 faculty and teachers. In that year, construction was completed on a $250,000, six-room primary school addition, followed by a million-dollar Upper School structure in 1984, at which time enrollment reached 355. In the 1990s, the campus hosted the Southern Indiana Japanese School. Its most recent improvement project is still in progress. Improvements that have been finished thus far include the enlargement of many classrooms, the construction of tennis courts, and a new track. A new atrium has recently been constructed.

== School divisions ==
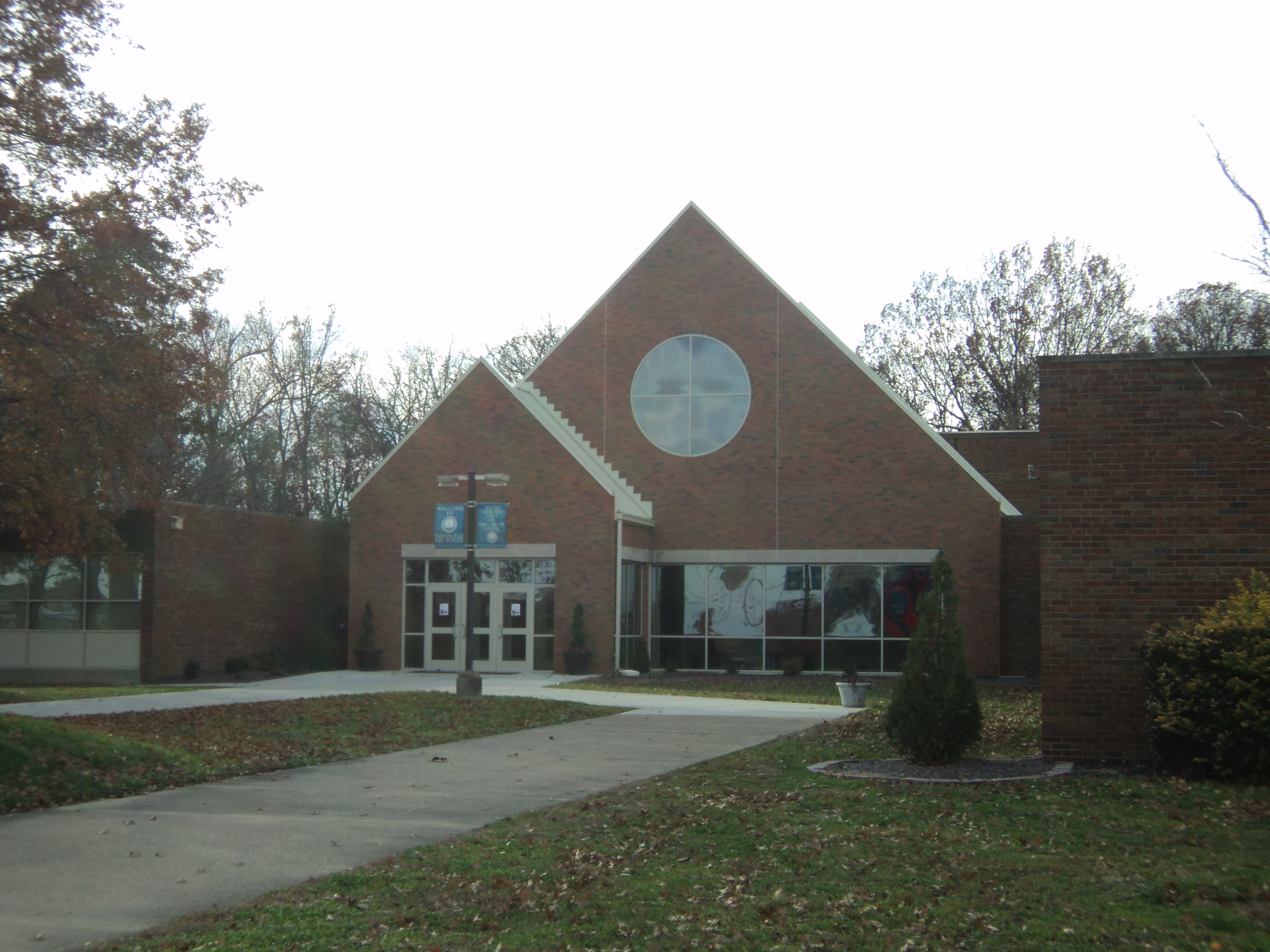
Evansville Day School is a private, college preparatory school in Evansville, IN.

=== Primary school ===
EDS offers two levels of preschool, Jr. PreK and PreK, as well as Kindergarten to 4th grades. Each grade has one teacher who teaches almost all of the students' classes, creating a unique student-teacher bond.

=== Middle school ===
Unlike most other middle schools in the area, Evansville Day School's middle school starts in the 5th grade and finishes in the 8th. In the 8th grade, all students take the high school classes of Algebra I and the first level of either French or Spanish. In each grade, EDS prides itself in teaching students with materials from one grade in advance from the grade in which they actually are, beginning in 5th grade. So 6th graders are taught a 7th grade level curriculum.

=== Upper School ===
In addition to college prep and Advanced Placement (AP) courses, EDS employs other special programs in its curriculum. Most years, Upper School students are taken on non-traditional learning experiences during Intersession. Intersession expands the classrooms to include not only the Tri-State area but to the rest of the country and world. In the past, a few activities for the week-long affair have included Habitat for Humanity, backpacking in the Smoky Mountains, and college tours all over the county. Other national and international trips have taken Day Students to Washington D.C., Chicago, Costa Rica, Rome, and Hong Kong. Along with Intersession, Senior Projects is considered a unique experience, taking place in the very end of each senior year. Students venture into the community for a two-week immersion into one or more fields. This ideally takes place with a business, institution, school, social, or health facility that is associated with a potential college major or possible career choice.

Students' SAT scores are among the top 1% in Indiana and the ten best high schools in the state.

== Athletics ==
Also see: Sports in Evansville.

EDS is a member of the Indiana High School Athletic Association (IHSAA) and participates in varsity basketball, soccer, track and field, tennis, and golf. EDS is not affiliated with an IHSAA conference. As of the 2021–22 school year, Evansville Day School is the second-smallest IHSAA boys basketball participant by high school enrollment, ranking 402 of 403 member schools. Despite this, EDS has won three IHSAA Class A sectional championships in 2012, 2019, and 2021. EDS alums have held the all-time City of Evansville high school boys basketball scoring record for most of the 21st century. Jeremy Willis held the city scoring record from 1999 to 2018, and Tyler Myers reclaimed the record for EDS in 2022.

In 1987, Brian Ritz won Evansville Day School's first IHSAA state championship in the boys singles tennis championship. In 1990 and 1991, Michael Goldstein finished runner-up in the IHSAA boys singles tennis championship. In 1997, Melissa Sugar took home two IHSAA girls swimming state championships in the 100 yard and 200 yard freestyle. In 2019, the girls soccer team advanced to the IHSAA Class A semistate game for the first time. The school's unique no-cut policy ensures students can have a positive high school athletic experience.

== Notable alumni ==
- William Snyder '77 - four-time Pulitzer Prize-winning photographer for The Dallas Morning News (1989, 1991, 1993, 2006)
- Stuart Comer '86 - art curator for the Museum of Modern Art
- Keach Hagey '95 - journalist for The Wall Street Journal and author
- Aleesia Johnson '95 - superintendent of Indianapolis Public Schools
- Peter M. McCoy Jr. '97 - U.S. Attorney for the District of South Carolina (2020–2021) and member of the South Carolina House of Representatives (2011–2020)

== See also ==
- List of high schools in Indiana
