= R. H. Robins =

English linguist (1921–2000)

Robert Henry Robins, FBA (1 July 1921 – 21 April 2000), affectionately known to his close ones as Bobby Robins, was a British linguist. Before his retirement, he spent his entire career at the Department of Phonetics and Linguistics at the School of Oriental and African Studies of the University of London.

Robin's work in linguistics covered several diverse areas, including Firthian prosodic analysis, endangered languages and the history of linguistic thought. He wrote two popular textbooks, General Linguistics: An Introductory Survey (1964) and A Short History of Linguistics (1967).

== Early life and education ==
Robins was born in Broadstairs, Kent, on 1 July 1921. His father was a medical practitioner.

In his childhood, Robins studied French, Latin and ancient Greek. He won a scholarship at Tonbridge School in 1935 and a scholarship for Classics to New College, Oxford, in 1940. He completed his university studies in 1948 with first class honours in Literae Humaniores (both Mods and Greats). During the Second World War, a stint where he taught Japanese to Royal Air Force servicemen attracted him to the field of linguistics. Robins later obtained a DLit degree from London University in 1968.

== Career ==
Robins served in the RAF Intelligence from 1942 to 1945 as language instructor. After completing his university studies Robins was appointed to a lectureship (1948–1955) in the Department of Phonetics and Linguistics in the School of Oriental and African Studies at London University. John Rupert Firth was the head of department at the time and was a major influence on Robins. Under Firth's directions, Robins carried out field work in the early 1950s on the now-extinct Yurok language of northern California and also did work on ancient linguistics. Robins later became reader in general linguistics (1955–1965), professor of general linguistics (1966–1986) and ultimately head of department (1970–1985) at the same institution. He served as dean of the Faculty of Arts (1984–86) of London University. He was elected a Fellow of the British Academy (FBA) in 1986.

Robins was a research fellow at the University of California in 1951. He was Visiting Professor in Washington (1963), Hawaii (1968), Minnesota (1971), Florida (1975) and Salzburg (1977 and 1979). He was also a Leverhulme Emeritus Fellow (1990–1991).

== Post-retirement activities ==
After retirement, Robins dedicated himself to promoting the history of linguistics. He wrote books on the subject and regularly attended conferences of the various national societies for the subject. He was emeritus professor (1986–2000) at London University. He taught at both University of Luton and University of Cambridge until the early months of 2000.

== Death ==
Robins died at his home in Caterham on 21 April 2000 at the age of 78.

== Affiliations ==
Robins was president of Societas Linguistica Europaea in 1974. He was British representative (1970–1977) and one-time president of the International Committee of Linguists (1977–1997). He was chairman of the Henry Sweet Society for the History of Linguistic Ideas at the time of his death. He was also an honorary member of Linguistic Society of America from 1981 until his death.

Perhaps Robins's most important fellowship was that of the Philological Society, the oldest linguistics society in existence. Robins was its secretary for 18 years (1961–1988) and later became its president (1988–1992). After his presidency ended, the Society conferred on him the title of President Emeritus uniquely in his honor. After Robins's death, the society created a prize in his name, the R. H. Robins Prize, "for an article submission on a linguistic topic that falls within the area of the Society’s interests as defined by present and past publications in the Transactions of the Philological Society."

The linguistics field as a whole have honored him with two Festschriften:

- F. R. Palmer and Theodora Bynon, eds. (1986) Studies in the history of linguistic science: a festschrift for R. H. Robins. Cambridge: Cambridge University Press.
- Law, Vivien; Hüllen, Werner, eds. (1996). Linguists and Their Diversions: A Festschrift for R. H. Robins on his 75th Birthday. Münster: Nodus. ISBN 3-89323-453-5.

== Selected works ==
- Ancient and Medieval Grammatical Theory in Europe (1951)
- The Yurok Language (1958)
- General Linguistics: An Introductory Survey (1964)
- A Short History of Linguistics (1967)
- Diversions of Bloomsbury (1970)
- Ideen- und Problemgeschichte der Sprachwissenschaft (1973)
- Sistem dan Struktur Bahasa Sunda (1983)
- The Byzantine Grammarians: Their Place in History (1993)
- Texts and Contexts: Selected Papers on the History of Linguistics (1998)
