= Vivien Law =

British linguist (1954–2002)

Vivien Law FBA
- Born: 22 March 1954; Halifax, Nova Scotia, Canada
- Died: 19 February 2002 (aged 47); Cambridge, England
- Spouse: Sir Nicholas Shackleton (m. 1986)

Academic background
- Education: Lemoyne d'Iberville High School; Trafalgar School for Girls
- Alma mater: McGill University; Girton College, Cambridge

Academic work
- Discipline: Linguistics
- Sub-discipline: Grammar; History of linguistics
- Institutions: University of Cambridge; Jesus College, Cambridge; Sidney Sussex College, Cambridge; Trinity College, Cambridge

Vivien Anne Law, Lady Shackleton (22 March 1954 – 19 February 2002) was a British linguist and academic, who specialised in grammar. Over her lifetime, she "acquired a grammatical knowledge of over a hundred languages". She spent all her academic career at the University of Cambridge.

== Early life and education ==
Law was born on 22 March 1954 in Halifax, Nova Scotia, Canada. Her parents, John Ernest Law and Anne Elizabeth Law, were both English, and they had moved to Canada for his job with a telecommunications company. She was educated at Lemoyne d'Iberville High School, a state school in Longueuil, Quebec, and at Trafalgar School for Girls, a private all-girls school in Montreal, Quebec.

From 1971 to 1974, Law studied at McGill University. She graduated with a double honours Bachelor of Arts (BA) degree in classics and German. In 1974, she won a Commonwealth Scholarship to study at the University of Cambridge in England. She then matriculated into Girton College, Cambridge to undertake postgraduate research under the supervision of Michael Lapidge. She completed her Doctor of Philosophy (PhD) degree in 1979. Her doctoral thesis was titled "The Ars Bonifacii: a critical edition with introduction, and commentary on the sources".

== Academic career ==
Law spent all her academic career at the University of Cambridge. She was a lecturer in the history of linguistics from 1984 to 1998, and Reader in the History of Linguistic Thought from 1998 to her death in 2002. She was also a research fellow at Jesus College, Cambridge from 1978 to 1980, a senior research fellow at Sidney Sussex College, Cambridge from 1980 to 1984, teaching fellow at Sidney Sussex College from 1984 to 1997, and fellow of Trinity College, Cambridge from 1997 to 2002.

== Personal life ==
In 1986, Law married Nicholas John Shackleton, a noted geologist and paleoclimatologist. They did not have any children. Upon his knighthood in 1998, she became Lady Shackleton.

In 1999, Law was diagnosed with cancer. Treatment resulted in temporary remission. She died at her home in Cambridge on 20 February 2002, aged 47.

== Honours ==
In 1999, Law was elected a Fellow of the British Academy, the United Kingdom's national academy for the humanities and the social sciences. The Vivien Law Prize was established in her memory in 2004 by the Henry Sweet Society and is awarded for "the best essay submitted on any topic within the history of linguistics".

== Selected works ==
- Law, Vivien (1987). The Insular Latin Grammarians. Woodbridge, Suffolk: Boydell Press. ISBN 978-0-85115-147-2.
- Law, Vivien, ed. (1993). History of Linguistic Thought in the Early Middle Ages. Amsterdam: John Benjamins Publishing Company. ISBN 978-1-55619-366-8.
- Law, Vivien (1995). The Morality of Medieval Grammar: Virgilius Maro Grammaticus and the Seventh Century. Cambridge: Cambridge University Press. ISBN 978-0-521-47113-8.
- Law, Vivien; Hüllen, Werner, eds. (1996). Linguists and Their Diversions: A Festschrift for R. H. Robins on his 75th Birthday. Münster: Nodus. ISBN 3-89323-453-5.
- Law, Vivien (1997). Grammar and Grammarians in the Early Middle Ages. London: Longman. ISBN 978-0-582-21294-7.
- Law, Vivien (2003). The History of Linguistics in Europe from Plato to 1600. Cambridge: Cambridge University Press. ISBN 978-0-521-56315-4.
