= Japanese Canadians in the Greater Toronto Area =

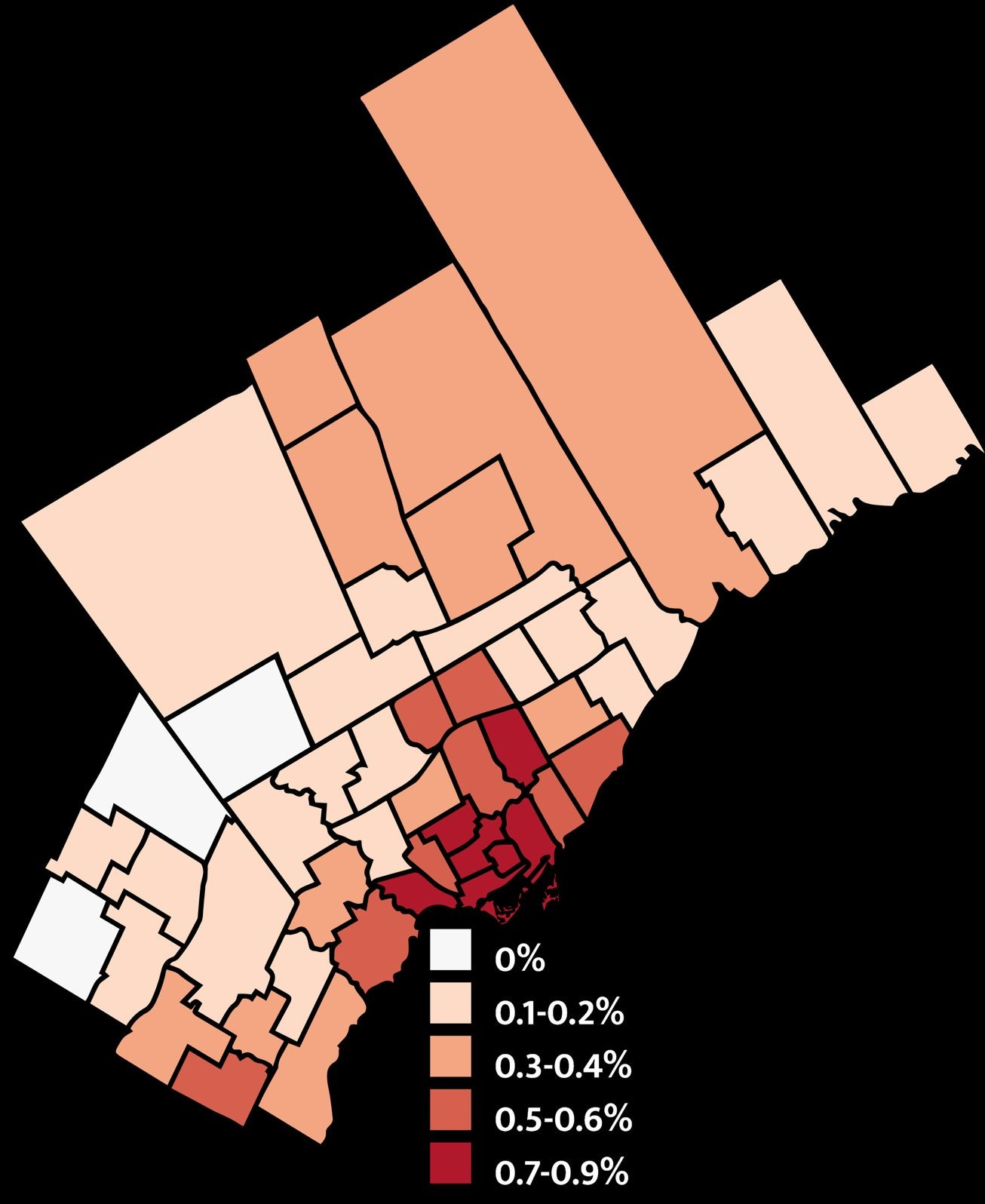
- Population distribution of Japanese Canadians in Toronto by federal electoral district, 2021 census

Toronto has a population of Japanese Canadians and also one of Japanese nationals. As of 2010 there are about 20,000 Japanese Canadians in Toronto. Adam McDowell of the National Post stated that Toronto's Japanese community was "never very large compared to, say, the Chinese or Italian communities".

Since the mid-2010s, Toronto has a Little Japan, which was formerly the city's first Chinatown.

== History ==
Two silk workers, Kenji Ishikawa and Shigesaburo Ubukata, appeared in the City of Toronto Directory in 1897; they were the first persons of Japanese heritage to appear in this directory.

There were only six Japanese families in Toronto until 1941, when Japanese Canadians were forcibly uprooted from the Pacific Coast. Politicians in British Columbia used the bombing of Pearl Harbor in World War II as an excuse to enact racist legislation which has been called "near ethnic cleansing". The population of Japanese Canadian individuals in Toronto increased to 5,000 by 1947. In the 1950s and 1970s Etobicoke, Scarborough, and other suburban areas in Greater Toronto received ethnic Japanese coming from western Canada.

By 2013, there had been an increase in the number of Japanese nationals in Toronto, particularly young people there on working holiday visa wishing to work or live in Canada.

== Demographics ==
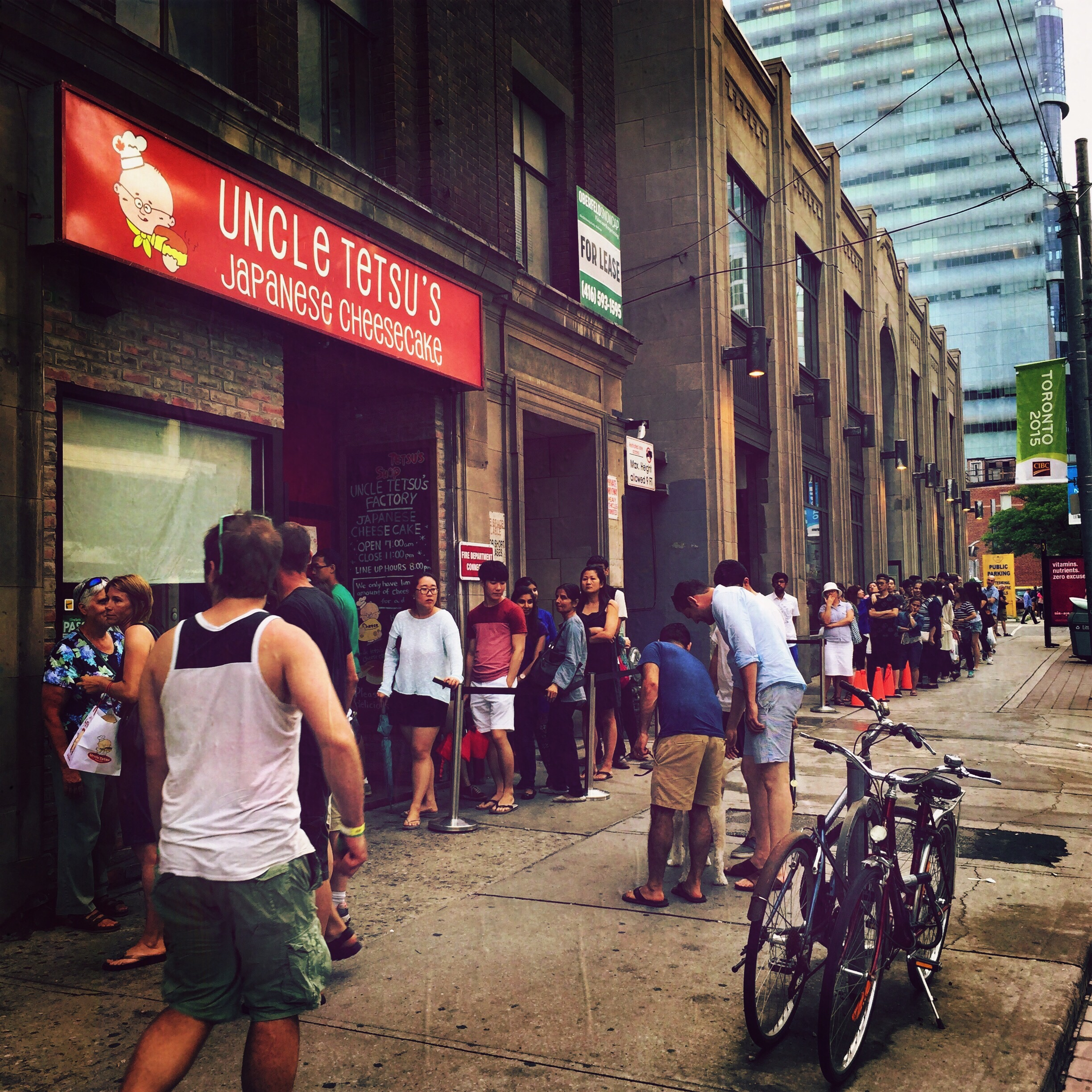
Uncle Tetsu's Cheesecake on Bay Street north of Dundas Street in Little Japan

As of 1999, of the Canadian cities, Toronto had the largest number of pure yonsei. As of the same year, 30.64% of Canadian-born Japanese Canadians are married to one another. This is the highest such percentage of any city in Canada.

In the early 1990s, of the Japanese Canadians in Toronto, about 20–25% were shinijusha, or new immigrants and residents from Japan, who come to Canada so they could become permanent residents.

== Institutions ==
The Japanese Canadian Cultural Centre (JCCC) holds Japanese cultural classes, contains a library of Japanese-Canadian and Japanese materials, and includes a gift shop. Bruce Kuwabara and Associates had remodeled the building which the JCCC currently occupies; it moved into it in 1999. It was originally established in 1967.

Other institutions include the Canada Japan Society (日加協会), the Japan Foundation, the Japan Society, and the New Japanese Canadian Association (NJCA).

== Media ==
The Canada Japan Business Review and the Japan Canada Journal are based in Toronto.

== Religion ==
As of 1999 the Toronto Buddhist Church includes many "Kika nisei", Japanese who had been educated in Japan but had been born in British Columbia, Canada.

== Education ==
The Toronto Japanese School, a supplementary Japanese school, serves the city's Japanese national and Japanese Canadian populations.

The Nisshu Gakuin Japanese Language School (日修学院日本語学校) is located in Toronto.

The Toronto Japanese Language School is also in the area. Previously the institution used the Orde Street Junior School of the Toronto District School Board (TDSB) for free, but in 2000 the TDSB began charging the Japanese School rent.

== Notable residents ==
- Ken Adachi (journalist)
- George Tanaka (civil rights activist and landscape artist)

== See also ==
- Japanese in Montreal
