= Kumon Leysin Academy of Switzerland =

- スイス公文学園高等部

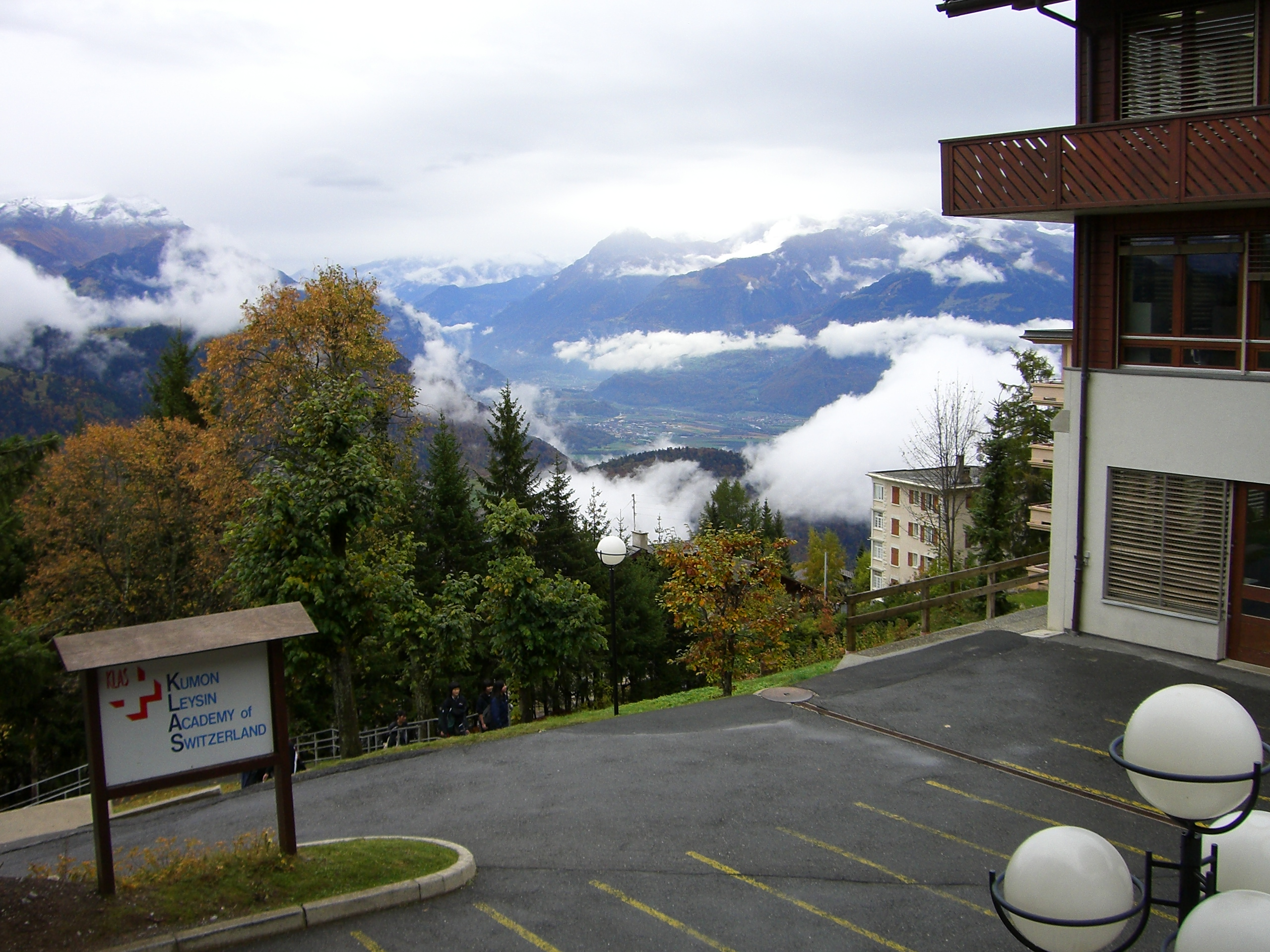

Location
- Route de Versmont 6 CP110, 1854 Leysin, Switzerland; Leysin, Vaud; Switzerland; 46°20′30.7″N 7°0′17.7″E

Information
- Type: Boarding school
- Established: 1990
- Principal: Ken Nishizuka
- Enrollment: 180 (as of Dec, 05)
- Campus: Leysin
- Website: www.klas-ac.jp/english/

Kumon Leysin Academy of Switzerland (KLAS) (スイス公文学園高等部, Suisu Kumon Gakuen Kōtōbu) is a private high school in Leysin, Switzerland, founded by the Kumon Gakuen Educational Foundation in 1990.

The school, a Shiritsu zaigai kyōiku shisetsu (私立在外教育施設) or an overseas branch of a Japanese private school, focuses on Japanese and Western university preparation for grades 10-12. KLAS is recognized by the Swiss Service de la Protection de la Jeunesse, Département Sociale et des Assurances and is a member of the European Council of International Schools (ECIS). KLAS is also accredited by the Japanese Ministry of Education, Culture, Sports, Science and Technology as an overseas educational facility. As such, the students obtain eligibility for entrance into Japanese universities upon graduation.

== Accreditation ==
KLAS' (upper) secondary education (Middle and High School) is not approved as a Mittelschule/Collège/Liceo by the Swiss Federal State Secretariat for Education, Research and Innovation (SERI).

== History ==
The Kumon Gakuen Educational Foundation founded the school in 1990.

== Operations ==
The school's official language is English and the school uses English for its public announcements.

The school maintains single sex dormitories for its students. The dormitory parents act in loco parentis. Each room has three to four students, generally of different grade levels.

== Demographics ==
The school has 30 full-time teachers and 60 students per grade, with the 10th, 11th, and 12th grades served.

== Education ==
- 10th Grade Curriculum

All tenth grade students follow the same curriculum, with approximately half of their 35 fifty-minute classes per week taught in English. Students attend seven classes per day, five days a week. Prior to entering the eleventh grade, students choose a course of study that reflects where they intend to pursue university studies.

- ACP Curriculum

Those students wishing to attend non-Japanese universities and who are deemed capable of embracing a rigorous academic program and workload enter the American College Preparation(ACP)program. This prepares students for undergraduate study in western universities, whilst also providing continued language support in ESL classes. In the senior year, students have the opportunity to take Advanced Placement(AP)courses in either Calculus or Studio Art.

- JCP Curriculum

KLAS students who plan to return to Japan for undergraduate studies take the Japanese College Preparation(JCP)program. Nevertheless, up to half of their weekly classes are offered in English, reflecting the core mission of KLAS as a bilingual educational institution. JCP students prepare for study at a Japanese university but, with their ever-developing English skills, the possibility for further studies at a non-Japanese university remains very strong.

== See also ==
- Japanese School in Zurich, Japanese international day school near Zurich
