= Orlando Hoshuko =

Weekend school in Florida, United States

Coordinates: 28.4607°N 81.4555°W

- オーランド日本語補習校

Information
- Type: private
- Established: 1988; 38 years ago
- Website: orlandohoshuko.org/index.html

The Orlando Hoshuko, Inc. (オーランド日本語補習校 Ōrando Nihongo Hoshūkō) is a weekend supplementary school for Japanese children in the Orlando, Florida area.

It was established as the Japanese Language School of Orlando in November 1998 and originally held its classes in MetroWest Elementary School. A Japanese businessperson and a Japanese government official had a conversation and had concluded that there should be a supplementary school in the Orlando area; this resulted in the school's establishment. The school was initially intended to serve Japanese persons temporarily living in the United States.

Initially the school had 18 students. It later moved its classes to a church in Kissimmee, Trinity Lutheran Church. As of 2007, there were 88 students, mostly at the elementary and junior high school levels. That year U.S.-born children made up 80% of the weekend school's students. As of 2007 the Japanese government gives the school about 40% of its funds.

== See also ==
- Japanese language education in the United States
