= Toronto Japanese School =

- トロント補習授業校

Location
- 845 St. Clair Avenue West, Suite 304 (school office); McMurrich Jr. Public School/ Winona Drive Sr. Public School; 115/101 Winona Drive, Toronto, Ontario M6G 3S8 (classroom); Toronto, Ontario, M6C 1C3; Canada

Information
- Type: Hoshu jugyo ko
- Founded: 1973
- Grades: K-12+
- Enrollment: 571 (April 2014)
- Language: Japanese
- Website: www.torontohoshuko.ca

Toronto Japanese School (トロント補習授業校, Toronto Hoshū Jugyō Kō), also known as The Japanese School of Toronto Shokokai Inc., is a school that provides specific Japanese educational curricula, located in the downtown area of Toronto, Ontario, Canada. It was established by the Toronto Shokokai Inc.

In 2014 the school borrowed the McMurrich Junior Public School building, for preschool and elementary school level classes, and the connected Winona Drive Senior Public School building for middle school and high school level classes.

The school holds its classes at McMurrich Jr. Public School/Winona Drive Sr. Public School.

== History ==
- September 1973 - Opens as a Japanese language school.
- April 1974 - Splits into Japanese language school and 補習授業校 (Hoshū Jugyō Kō).
- May 1976 - Hoshu jugyo ko becomes an independent school.
- April 1977 - Class for preschool level is established.
- December 1977 - School anthem トロント補習授業校の歌 (Toronto Hoshū Jugyō Kō no Uta) is created
- April 1978 - Class for high school level is established.

== Student population ==
As of April 15, 2014:

- Preschool: 88
- Elementary school: 346
- Middle school: 95
- High school: 42

== See also ==
- Japanese Canadians in the Greater Toronto Area
- Montreal Hoshuko School
