= Colegio Japonés Auxiliar de Quito =

Japanese school in Quito, Ecuador

Colegio Japonés Auxiliar de Quito (キト補習授業校 Kito Hoshū Jugyō Kō) is a supplementary Japanese school located in the Pusuquí area of Quito, Ecuador.

The Quito Japanese school became the only Japanese educational option in Quito after the Colegio Japonés de Quito (キト日本人学校 Kito Nihonjin Gakkō), the full-time Japanese school, closed in 2003.
