= Japanese School in Zurich =

- チューリッヒ日本人学校; Japanische Schule in Zürich

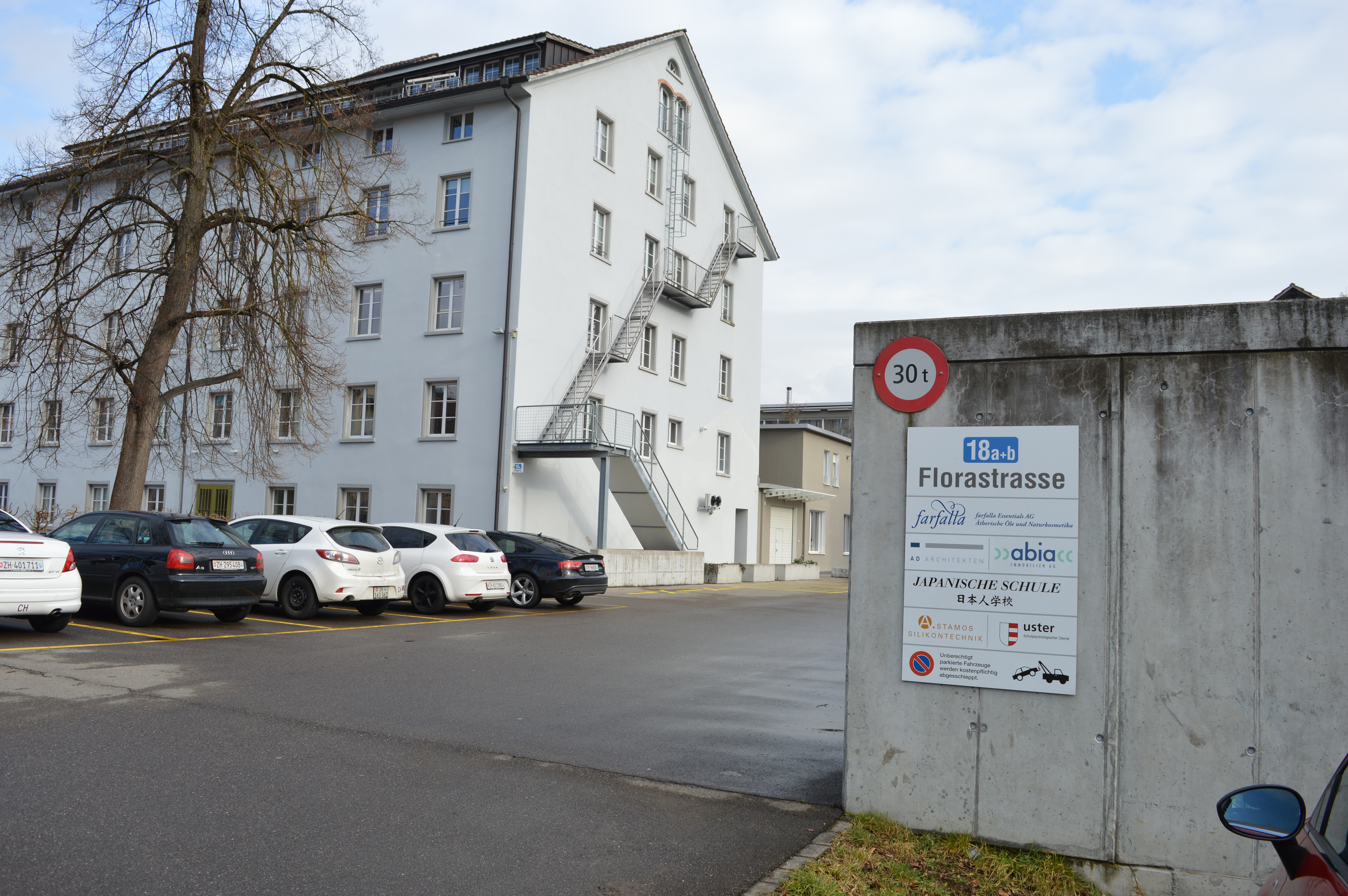

Location
- Florastr.18a 8610 Uster; Uster; Switzerland; 47.347464°N 8.720460°E

Information
- Type: Primary & middle school
- Grades: 1-9
- Website: jszurich.ch

The Japanese School in Zurich (German: Japanische Schule in Zürich, Japanese: チューリッヒ日本人学校 Chūrihhi Nihonjin Gakkō) is a Japanese international school in Uster, Canton of Zürich, Switzerland, situated in the Zurich metropolitan area. It has a day school division and it has a weekend complementary school that meets on Wednesdays and Saturdays. It is the sole non-boarding Japanese day school in Switzerland, and it serves kindergarten, elementary school, and junior high school (equivalent to Zurich cantonal Sekundarstufe I).

Japanese School in Zurich's primary education program (elementary) is approved as Primarstufe by the bureau for elementary school (Volksschulamt), administration for education (Bildungsdirektion), canton of Zurich. However, not the Kindergarten.

The Japanese School in Zurich's lower secondary education program (junior-secondary) is approved as Sekundarstufe by the bureau for elementary school (Volksschulamt), administration for education (Bildungsdirektion), canton of Zurich.

On 20 October 1975 (Shōwa 20), the Japanese Language School in Zurich (German: Japanische Schule Zürich), the predecessor institution, opened with 15 students. On 23 April 1988 (Showa 63), the permanent day school Japanese School in Zurich opened with 57 students, of which 50 were elementary school students and seven were junior high school students.

Students take Japanese and English courses, and they also take German two times every week.

== See also ==
- Kumon Leysin Academy of Switzerland, private Japanese high school in Switzerland
