= Montreal Hoshuko School =

- モントリオール日本語補習校; École Hoshuko Montréal

Location
- 3495 Simpson, Montréal, Québec H3G 2J7 c/o Trafalgar School for Girls (last stated address); Montreal; Canada; 45.4987314°N 73.58429839999997°W

Information
- Established: 1972; 54 years ago
- Website: hoshuko.ca

The Montreal Hoshuko School (French: École Hoshuko Montréal Inc, Japanese: モントリオール日本語補習校 Montoriōru Nihongo Hoshūkō) is a Japanese supplementary weekend school in Montreal, Quebec. The members of the Montreal Shōkōkai (モントリオール商工会; Japanese Association of Commerce and Industry) manage and assist the administrative and financial aspects of the Montreal Hoshuko and have done so since the school's founding. The Montreal Hoshuko serves both Japanese nationals and Japanese Canadians. The school last indicated that classes were held at the Trafalgar School for Girls, where the weekend school rented space. As of 2017 the school keeps its classroom location confidential, citing safety reasons.

== History ==
Due to requests from Japanese national parents, the Montreal Hoshuko School opened in July 1972; the Japanese Ministry of Education (Monbusho) and the Japanese Ministry of Foreign Affairs assisted the school's development. This opening was one of the factors that caused Montreal's Japanese population to increase. Initially classes were held at a Japanese culture hall. Beginning in March 1983 school held classes at the Westmount Park School in Westmount.

The Japanese school initially had a mission entirely focused on the expatriate population. The Japanese national population of Montreal increased in the 1970s and 1980s due to the expansion of the Japanese economy, and this caused the hoshuko's enrollment to increase. Larger numbers of Japanese Canadian children, sons and daughters of immigrant parents, began attending the school in the mid-1980s. Some Japan-born parents feared that the admission of non-Japanese nationals would cause the school to water down its curriculum and complicate their own children's entry into prestigious Japanese universities.

The hoshuko's peak enrollment, with 95 students, was in 1989. Because many Japanese corporations and other corporations removed operations from Quebec, enrollment decreased after the 1980s. As fewer Japanese nationals attended, the Hoshuko School increasingly began to accommodate the Canadian students. In 1999 classes moved to the Trafalgar School.

By 2003 the numbers of students who each have one Japanese parent and one non-Japanese parent have increased, and as of that year the school now admits non-Japanese Canadians. Mary H. Maguire of McGill University stated that the school became a Japanese community gathering center, a "place of relaxation," and more open to cultural and ethnic diversity.

== Student and parent demographics ==
As of 2001 the enrollment was more than 50 students. The school, as of 2003, has two main groups of students: children of academics and children of businesspersons. The businessperson families historically were the wealthiest segment and provided financial support for the weekend school. In the school's early years prominent positions of the school's steering committee included employees of the Bank of Tokyo, Mitsubishi, and Mitsui. Compared to the businessperson families, the academics have placed more focus on studies at the local schools and learning about other cultures.

As of 2003, about half of the students were children of Japanese persons and about half were the children of ethnic Japanese born in Canada. Some students were from mixed marriages.

As of 2001 some students commute from Quebec City and Sherbrooke. The school served families living in Ottawa until its own Japanese weekend school opened.

== See also ==
- Japanese in Montreal
- Toronto Japanese School
