= Trafalgar School for Girls =

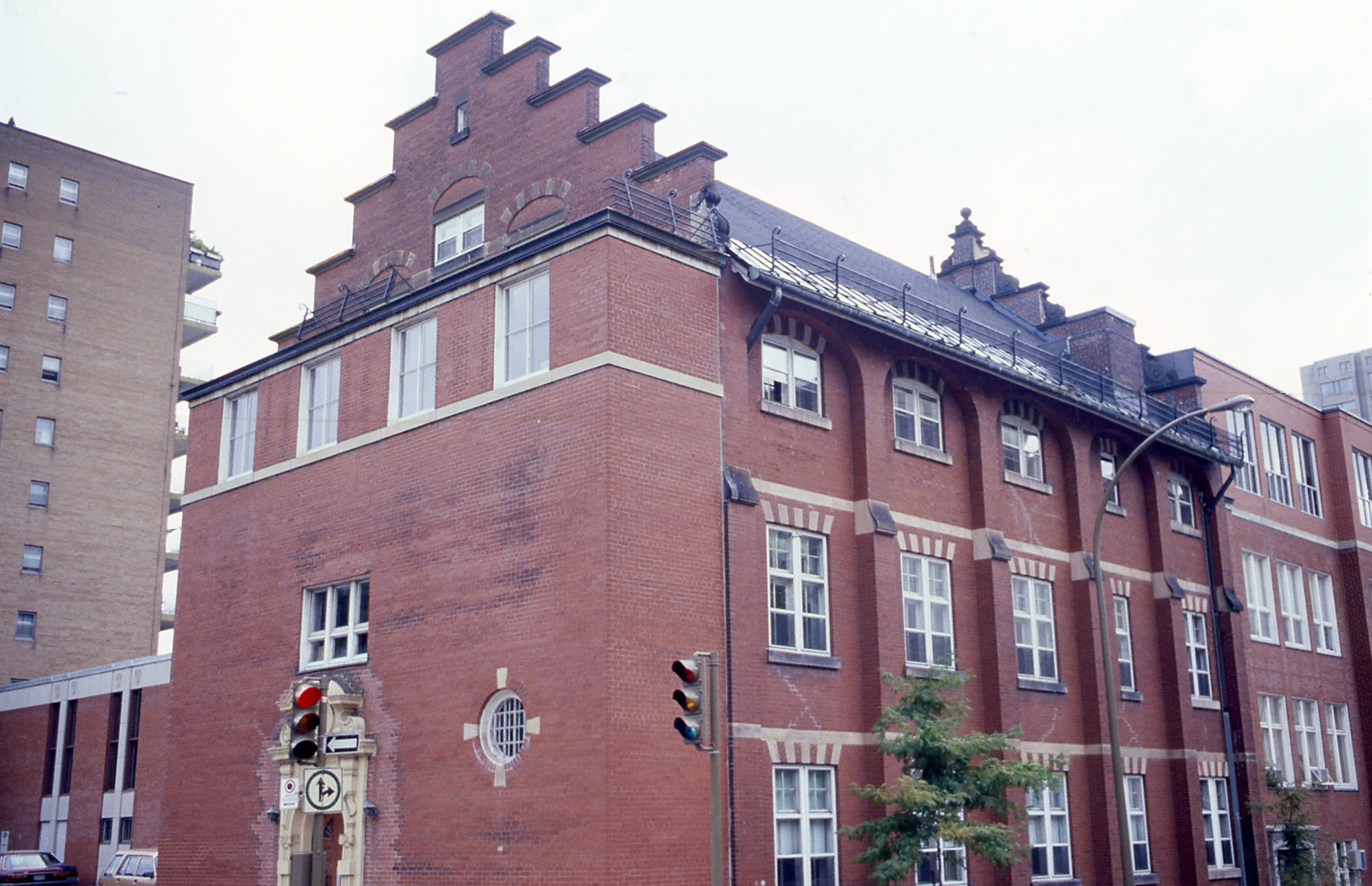

Location
- 3495 Simpson Street; Montreal, Quebec, Canada; 45.4988°N 73.5841°W

Information
- School type: Independent day school
- Founded: 1887; 139 years ago
- Purpose: College-preparatory school
- Gender: Girls
- Language: English
- Website: trafalgar.qc.ca

Trafalgar School for Girls (abbreviated as Traf) is an all-girls independent school located in Downtown Montreal, Quebec. The school serves students at Secondary I – V levels, i.e. ages 11–12 to 16–17. The total enrollment is 200, the student-teacher ratio is 8:1, and the average class size is a range from 10 to 20. The current Head of School is Katherine Nikidis.

== Background ==
The site is within the Golden Square Mile, which was the richest neighbourhood in Canada when the school opened in 1887. The idea came from a wealthy merchant named Donald Ross. The institute received funds from Anne Scott and Donald Smith, 1st Baron Strathcona and Mount Royal, as well as other prominent residents of Montreal. The school's curriculum was designed to prepare girls for higher education, although only a small minority actually went to university.

The Montreal Hoshuko School, a weekend Japanese school, rents classroom space there.

Trafalgar announced the sale of its Simpson St. building in 2019. In September 2020, it was announced that Trafalgar and McGill University would be partnering on the CoLab, which will integrate teacher training, classroom practice and research in one place. Trafalgar will be situated at Purvis Hall at the corner of Peel Street and Pine Avenue, close to the McGill campus.

== Notable alumna ==
- Christine Ayoub, mathematician
- Nora Collyer, painter
- Caryl Churchill, playwright
- Jessalyn Gilsig, actress
- Vivien Law, linguist and academic
- Carolyn Taylor, writer actor and comedian
- Cairine Wilson, politician
- Rhona and Rhoda Wurtele, Olympic skiers
