= India–Latin America relations =

International relations

India

Latin America

India–Latin America relations are relations between India and the countries of Latin America. Trade is the main factor in India–Latin America relations. Latin America is India's fifth-biggest trading partner (if treated as one country).

== History ==
=== Pre-21st century ===
Before India's independence in 1947, contact between India and Latin America was minimal. A few Indians came into Latin America during this time period due to the trans-pacific slave trade.

In the first 50 years after India's independence, ties between India and Latin America remained minimal; India's participation in the Non-Aligned Movement and the British Commonwealth, as well as its geographical distance from Latin America, separated it from the region. Victor Alba argued that China's greater efforts in narrating its development efforts to the international community meant that it received far greater attention from Latin America than India by 1960. As recently as 1992, Indo-LAC (Latin America and the Caribbean) trade was worth less than $500 million. In addition, there were a few instances where Latin American countries had tensions with India, such as when Argentina and Ecuador had disagreements on India's territorial integrity.

However, India did provide support in UN votes to Latin American countries in their conflicts with America, resulting in reciprocal support, and the Indian diaspora in LAC (such as the Indo-Caribbeans) was one of the factors providing a connection between India and Latin America throughout this time.

=== 21st century ===
In the 21st century, India–Latin America relations have increased significantly. In 1996, as India and Latin America were taking steps to liberalize their economies, India started a "Focus LAC" policy. In recent years, India has sought to improve relations with Latin America as part of its overall desire to be a leader on the world stage. Latin America for its part has sought stronger ties with India as it has moved from a Western-oriented foreign policy in previous centuries to a more multipolar approach. In 2012, the first India-CELAC (Community of Latin American and Caribbean States) summit was hosted in New Delhi.

== Economic relations ==
60% of Indo-LAC trade goes through the Indian state of Gujarat

India-Latin American trade peaked at $50 billion in 2022, and is projected to reach $100 billion by 2027. Latin America receives 1/3rd of India's car exports, while India seeks energy and food security through Latin America, with half of Latin America's exports to India being commodity-based. Weak transport capability and above-average tariffs are said to be significant factors holding India-Latin America trade back.

India signed a Preferential Trade Agreement (PTA) with Mercosur in 2004. Peru, Chile and Colombia have expressed interest in signing or have expanded their PTAs with India in recent decades.

=== Vis-a-vis China ===
India and China are sometimes analyzed as competing for engagement with Latin America; Indian FDI in the region is around $12–16 billion, while Chinese FDI is worth $159 billion, with the Chinese having had a longer involvement in the region.

== Cultural relations ==
=== Cinema ===
There has been a rise in films being exchanged between the two sides, with some actors participating in transnational cinema, such as Barbara Mori in Kites. A greater number of Latin American actors have also begun applying for Indian visas to act in Bollywood films.

=== Literature ===
At the turn of the postcolonial era, literary exchanges occurred, with Indian writers such as Rabindranath Tagore and Latin Americans such as Victoria Ocampo being read by the other side; Octavio Paz, a Mexican ambassador to India in the 1960s, played a significant role in initiating these ties. Malayalam literature in particular has absorbed Latin American influences.

=== Sports ===
Kerala and West Bengal, which share characteristics with Latin America such as left-leaning politics, are known for passionately supporting Latin American football teams.

In the 2000s, Cuba had been considering making cricket its national sport for diplomatic purposes, despite having much more heritage in baseball; India and other Commonwealth nations were encouraging this move.

== Relations with Latin American countries ==
- Argentina–India relations
- Bolivia–India relations
- Brazil–India relations
- Chile–India relations
- Colombia–India relations
- Costa Rica–India relations
- Cuba–India relations
- Dominican Republic–India relations
- Ecuador–India relations
- El Salvador–India relations
- Guatemala–India relations
- Honduras–India relations
- India–Mexico relations
- India–Nicaragua relations
- India–Panama relations
- India–Paraguay relations
- India–Peru relations
- India–Uruguay relations
- India–Venezuela relations

== See also ==
- BRICS
- IBSA Dialogue Forum
- BASIC countries
