= Indian Mexicans =

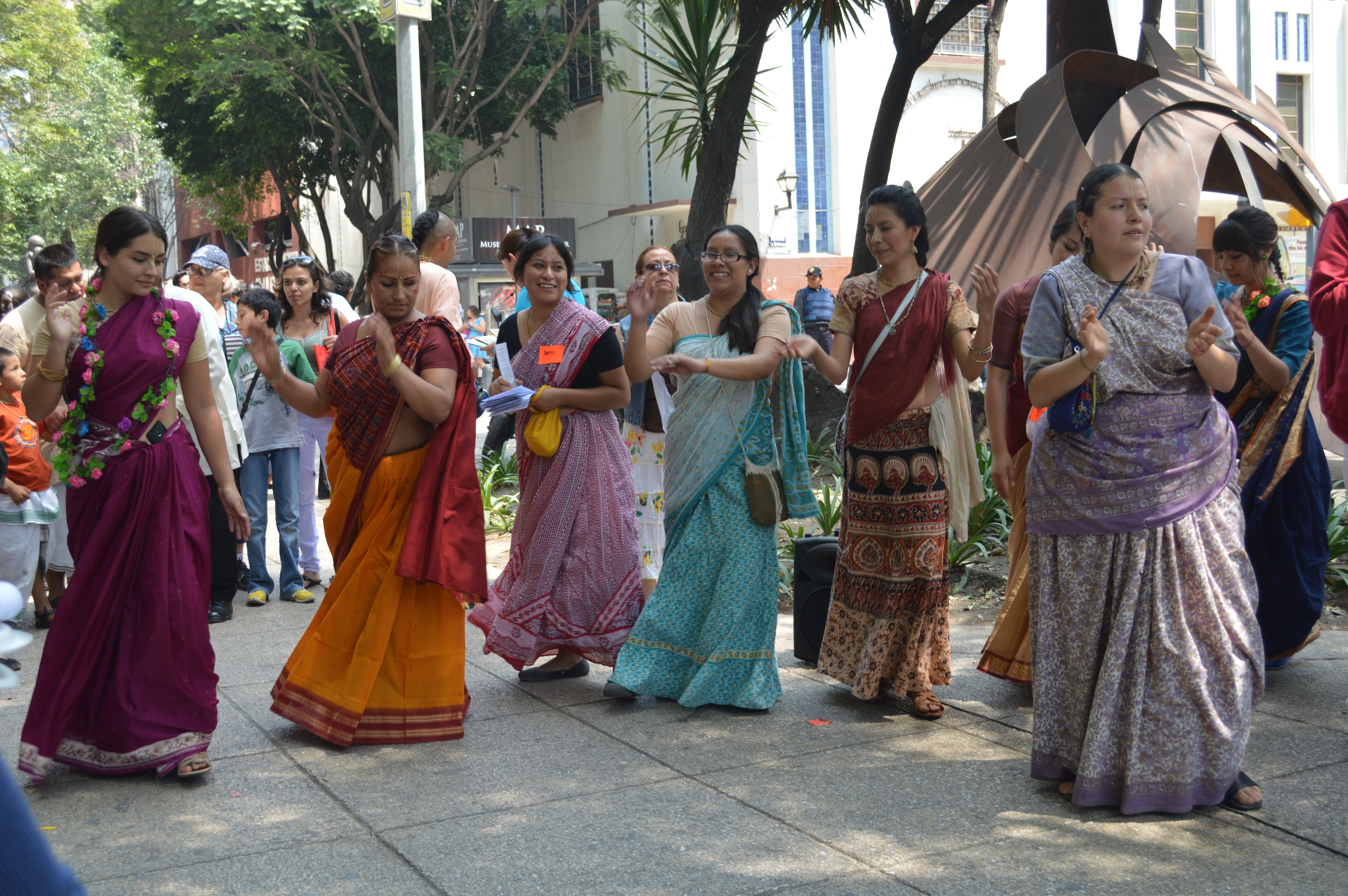

Total population
- 1,825

Regions with significant populations
- Mostly concentrated in urban areas such as: Guadalajara, Mexico City, Monterrey, Hermosillo, Mexicali, Tijuana, coastal region of Michoacán, Isthmus of Tehuantepec

Languages
- English, Mexican Spanish, Malayalam, Kannada, Marathi, Punjabi, Tamil, Bengali, Gujarati, Hindi, other Languages of India

Religion
- Predominantly Catholicism (Latin Rite, Syro-Malabar and Syro-Malankara); Hinduism; Islam; Sikhism

Related ethnic groups
- Other Asian Mexicans, Indian diaspora, Punjabi Mexican Americans, Romani Mexicans

Indian Mexicans are Mexican citizens who are descendants of migrants from India.

== History ==
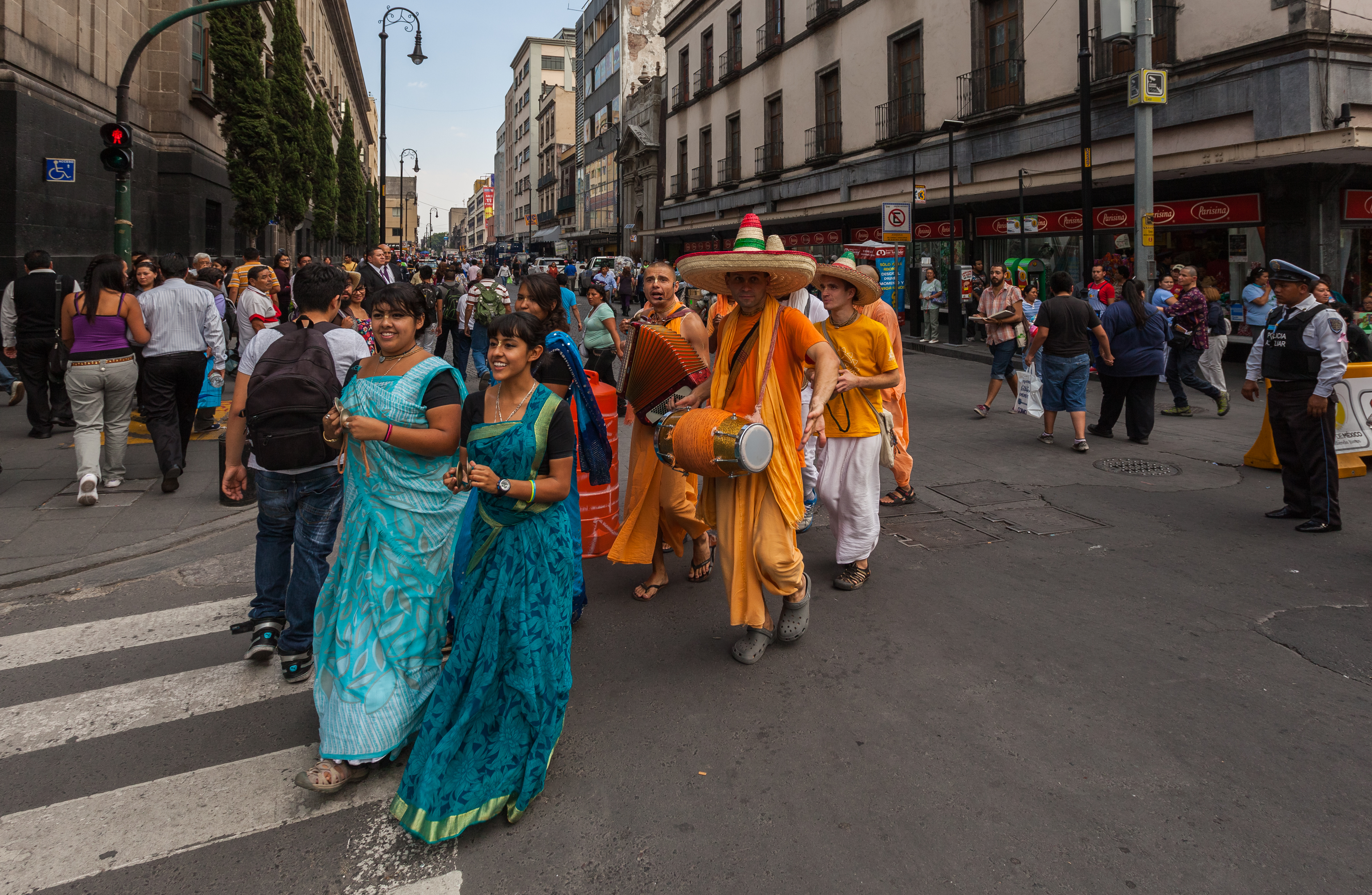
Indians in Mexico City, Mexico

=== Early immigration ===
The first Indians arrived in Mexico during the colonial era. During this period, thousands of Asians arrived via the Manila galleons, some of them as slaves termed chinos or indios chinos (lit. 'Chinese', regardless of actual ethnicity). The first record of an Asian in Mexico is from 1540; an enslaved cook originating from Calicut. The best known "china" was Catarina de San Juan, a girl captured by Portuguese slave traders in Cochin.

In 1923, immigration of ethnic Indians was secretly prohibited (along with other ethnicities as well). The ban was kept confidential in order to avoid diplomatic problems with the British Empire. This ban, along with similar bans based on ethnicity, was eliminated by a 1947 law that prohibited racial discrimination.

=== Modern status ===
Most of the Indians in Mexico are recent arrivals in the country and most of them have settled in Guadalajara and Mexico City. Mexico has a non-discriminatory policy with regard to the grant of its citizenship. The spouse of a Mexican national would generally not face any problem in acquiring local citizenship. Although a few of the NRIs have married Mexicans, they have retained their Indian citizenship.

Indian Mexicans are mainly businessmen or professionals. Many of them work with one or other international organization or a multinational corporation. There are also some academicians and scientists among them. They have helped to bring about greater mutual understanding between India and their host country. Some of the Indians work for "ISPAT Mexicana" which is part of the Laxmi Mittal group, well known in this region for having turned around a sinking steel company in Lázaro Cárdenas. TATA Consulting also has a huge investment with offices in Guadalajara.

According to the Indian Ministry of External Affairs, there were about 2,000 Indians living in Mexico as of March 2011. In December 2018, the ministry estimated there are about 6,500 people of Indian descent. In 2020, there were 2,656 people from Indian origin in Mexico, according to the Censo General de Población y Vivienda, by the National Institute of Statistics and Geography.

== Indian culture in Mexico ==
=== Religion ===
The main Indian community organisation is the Indian Women's Association of Mexico (IWAM) in Mexico City. It celebrates important festivals and organises cultural programmes. A Sai Baba temple, a Vaishnav temple and a Gurudwara have also been constructed by Sangam Organisation in Mexico City.

In Tijuana, Hinduism is practiced in diverse ways among both Indian-origin Hindus and local converts. Some cross over to San Diego to access religious products and Hindu temples, while others practice at home with small altars. This adaptability allows them to adjust rituals to new realities, influencing gender roles and relationships with their countries of origin and residence.

=== Sport ===
Indian and British diaspora members have been noted for re-establishing cricket in Mexico in modern times.

== Notable individuals ==
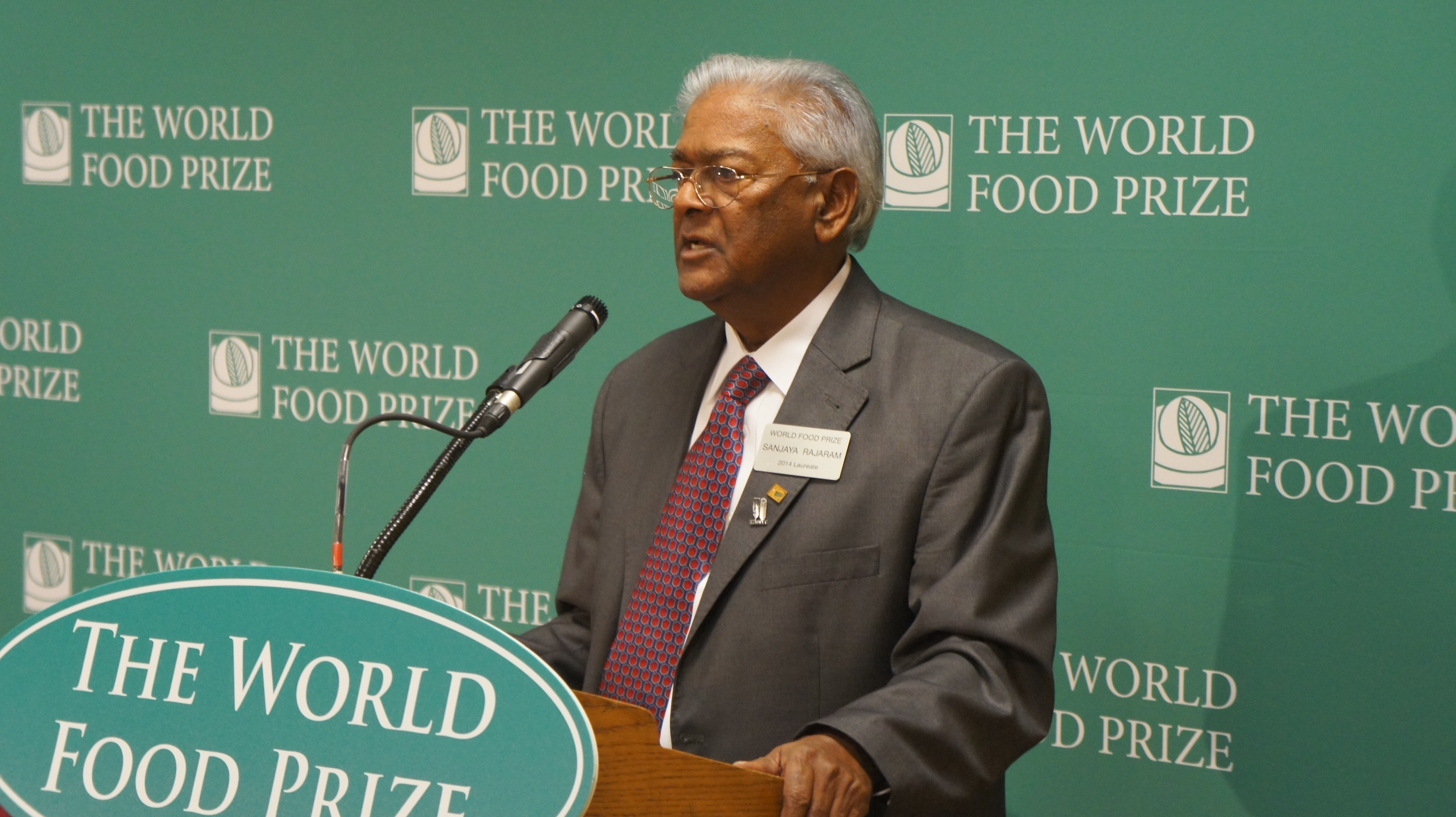
Dr. Sanjaya Rajaram

- Manabendra Nath Roy – Founder of the Mexican Communist Party
- Rajagopal – Expert in business and marketing at Tec de Monterrey
- Sanjaya Rajaram – Agronomist and creator of 480 types of wheat
- Ravi Prakash Singh
- Babaji Singh – Mexican Sikh credited with translating the Guru Granth Sahib into Spanish
- Pandurang Sadashiv Khankhoje – One of the founding fathers of the Ghadar Party
- Catarina de San Juan (Mirra) – Girl brought to colonial Mexico as a slave; i.e., the "China poblana"

== See also ==
- Hinduism in Mexico
- Asian Latin Americans
- India–Mexico relations
- Punjabi Mexican Americans
- Romani Mexicans
