= Indians in Panama =

- (India) (Panama)
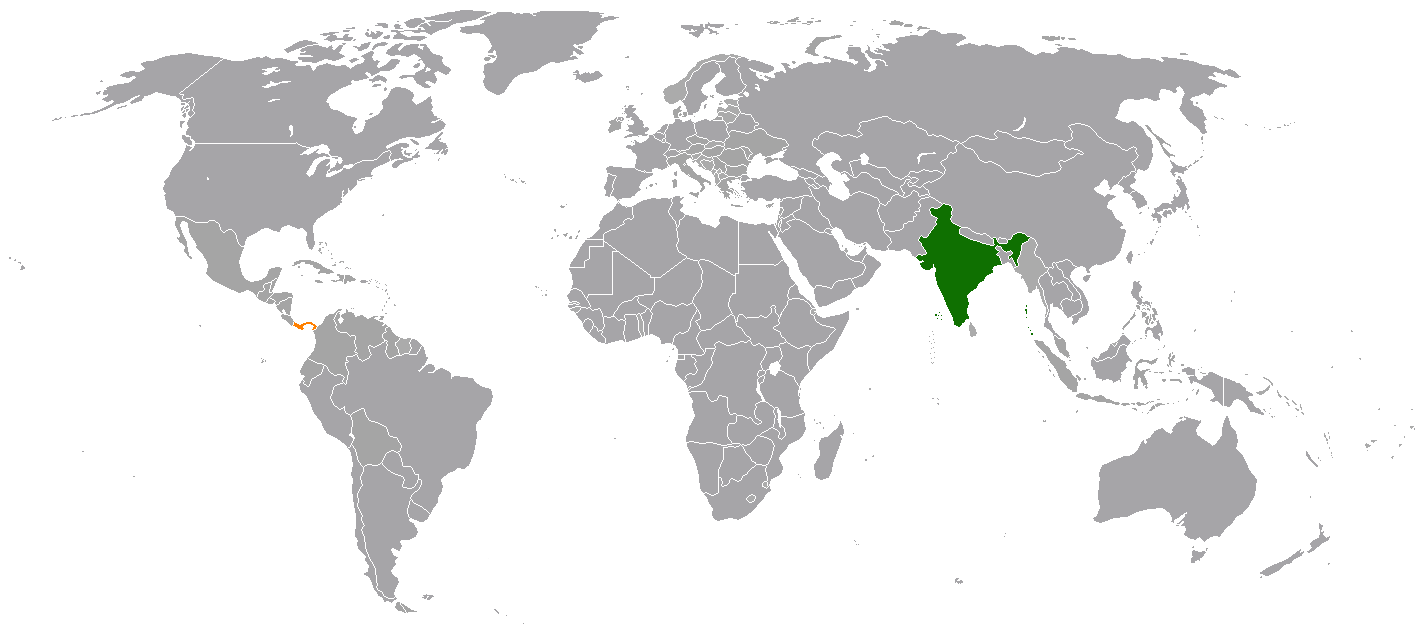

Total population
- 15,000

Regions with significant populations
- Panama City · Colón

Languages
- Spanish · English · Various Indian languages

Religion
- Sikhism · Hinduism · Catholicism · Islam · Religions of India

Related ethnic groups
- Asian Indians in Belize · Indians in Venezuela

There are an estimated 15,000 people of Indian origin in Panama. Many are employed in the shipping industry while others are mainly engaged in commerce. A majority are Hindu, with a substantial Muslim and Sikh minority, and they maintain Hindu temples, gurdwaras, and mosques in Panama City and Colón.

The majority of Panama's Indian community originates from Punjab, Gujarat, and Sindh (now a part of Pakistan). The first significant immigration was during the US phase of the building of the Panama Canal and were primarily from the Caribbean (islands and British Guiana, now Guyana) under British rule. Many of the founders of the Colón Free Zone were Indians. Since then, the Indian community has grown with a slow but steady stream of immigrants.

Panamanians of Indian descent speak their native languages which include Punjabi, Gujarati, and Sindhi. Spanish is also used in the community between speakers of two languages that are not mutually intelligible.

== Notable people ==
- Mehr Eliezer - Winner of Señorita Panamá 2019 (she represented Panama at Miss Universe 2019). She was born in New Delhi, India and raised in Ciudad de Panamá.

== See also ==
- Hinduism in Panama
- India–Panama relations
