= India–Mexico relations =

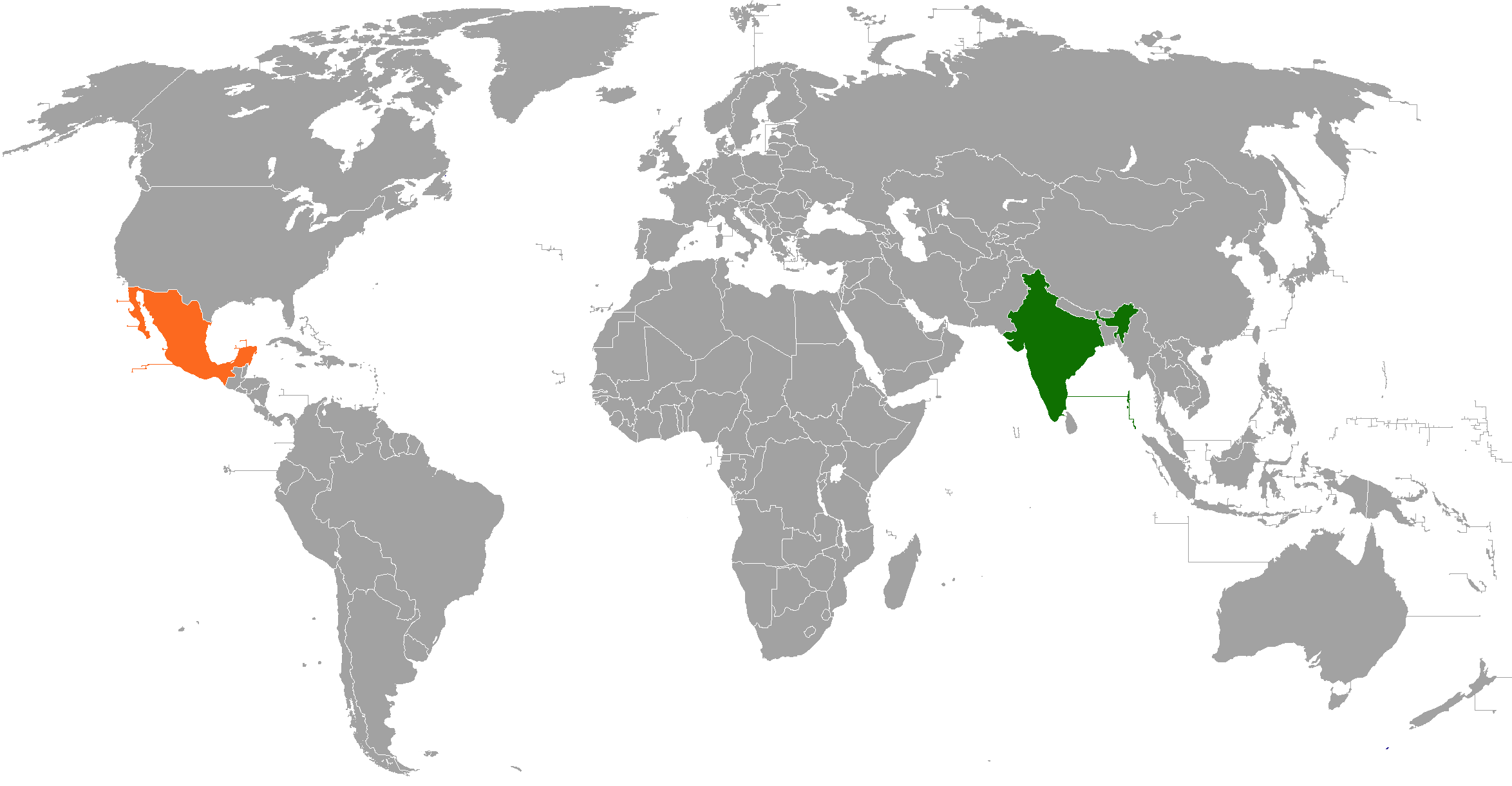

- India: Mexico

Diplomatic mission
- Embassy of India, Mexico City: Embassy of Mexico, New Delhi

Envoy
- Indian Ambassador to Mexico Pankaj Sharma: Mexican Ambassador to India Federico Salas Lotfe

India and Mexico have had contact since the 1500s, but formal diplomatic relations were first established in 1950. Both nations are members of the G-20 major economies and the United Nations.

== History ==
During colonialism in both India and Mexico, relations and trade were carried out by the Spanish who through the Manila-Acapulco Galleon traded with Indian traders and brought their products to New Spain (present day Mexico). In the 1500s, a few hundred Indians were taken as slaves and transported to Mexico. In the 1600s, an Indian woman in Mexico known as Catarina de San Juan was kidnapped by Portuguese pirates and brought to the Philippines. From there, she was brought to Mexico and sold to a man in the Mexican State of Puebla. Her presence in Puebla inspired the creation of the China poblana dress, based on the traditional gowns that she wore.

In 1947, Mexico became the first Latin American nation to recognize the independence of India from the United Kingdom. On first 1 August 1950, both nations established diplomatic relations and on the following year, Mexico opened an embassy in Delhi. To show the importance of the new relations between the two nations, the first Mexican ambassador to India was former Mexican President Emilio Portes Gil. In 1962, Nobel Prize laureate Octavio Paz was named ambassador to India.

In 1961, Prime Minister Jawaharlal Nehru became the first Indian head-of-state to pay a visit to Mexico. In 1962, Mexican President Adolfo López Mateos paid an official visit to India. There would be many more high-level visits between leaders of both nations.

During the Goa liberation movement, when Indo-Portuguese tensions soared, Mexico offered the Indian government its influence in Latin America to bring pressure on the Portuguese to relieve tensions.

Both nations work closely in several multilateral organizations. The Sonora variety of Mexican wheat was fundamental in the Green Revolution in India. In 2010, India opened a cultural center in Mexico City in response to the broad interests manifested in Mexico by the different facets of Indian culture and lifestyle.

In June 2016, Indian Prime Minister Narendra Modi paid an official visit to Mexico. While in Mexico, Prime Minister Modi met with President Enrique Peña Nieto and the two leaders held bilateral, political and economic partnership discussions.

In March 2022, Mexican Foreign Minister Marcelo Ebrard paid a visit to India and met with his counterpart S. Jaishankar. While in India, Ebrard met with local business leaders in order to increase trade relations between India and Mexico. Ebrard also announced the upcoming opening of a Mexican consulate in Mumbai. The consulate in Mumbai was opened in March 2023.

== High-level visits ==
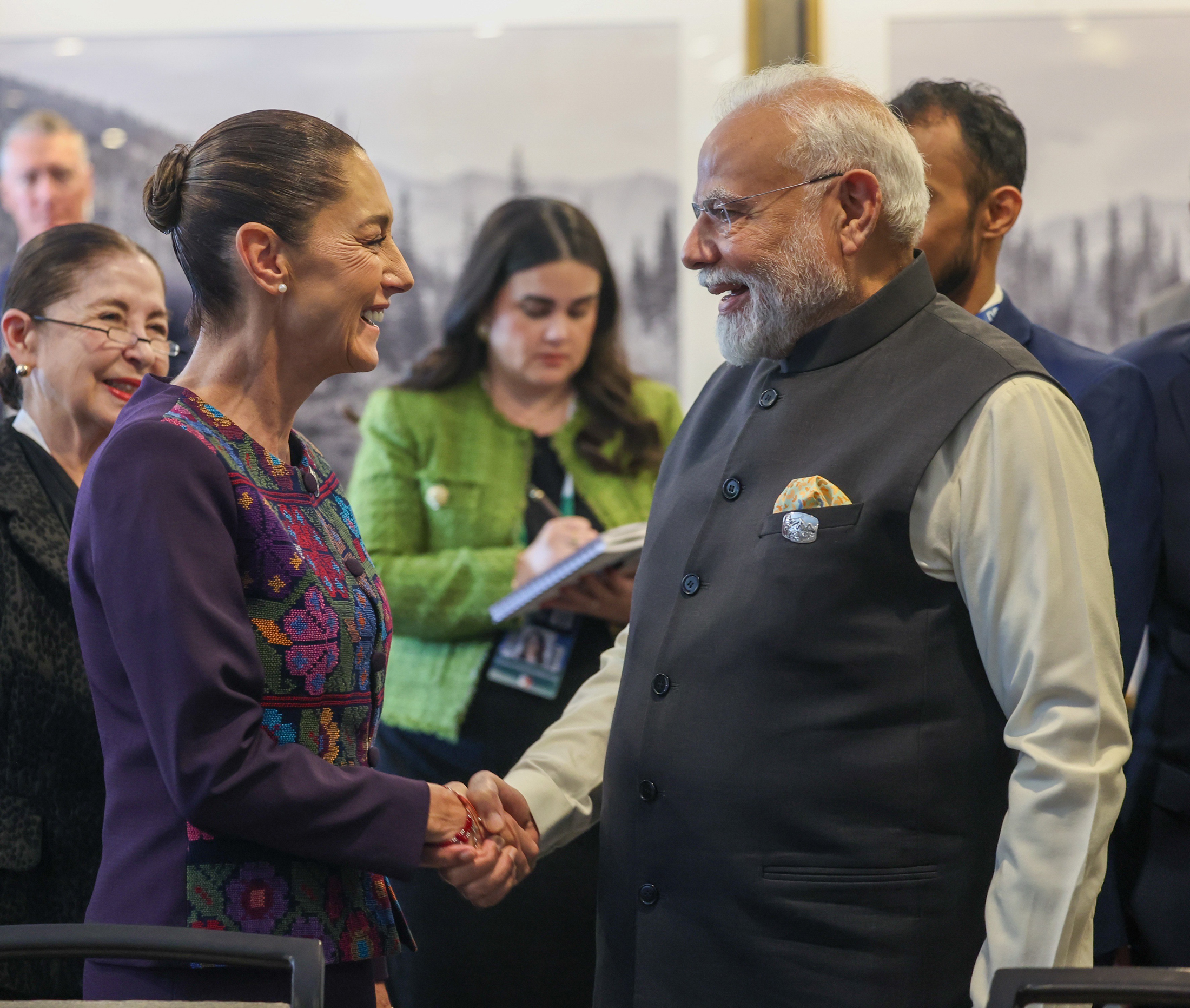
Prime Minister Narendra Modi with President Claudia Sheinbaum on the sidelines of 51st G7 summit at Kananaskis, Canada; June 2025.

High-level visits from India to Mexico

- Prime Minister Jawaharlal Nehru (1961)
- Foreign Minister P. V. Narasimha Rao (1980)
- Prime Minister Indira Gandhi (1981)
- President Zail Singh (1984)
- Prime Minister Rajiv Gandhi (1986)
- President Pratibha Patil (2008)
- Prime Minister Manmohan Singh (2012)
- Prime Minister Narendra Modi (2016)
- Foreign Minister S. Jaishankar (2021)

High-level visits from Mexico to India

- President Adolfo López Mateos (1962)
- President Luis Echeverría (1975)
- President José López Portillo (1981)
- President Miguel de la Madrid (1985)
- Foreign Secretary Jorge Castañeda Gutman (2002)
- Foreign Secretary Luis Ernesto Derbez (2004)
- President Felipe Calderón (2007)
- Foreign Secretary Patricia Espinosa (2010)
- Foreign Secretary José Antonio Meade (2014)
- Foreign Secretary Claudia Ruiz Massieu (2016)
- Foreign Secretary Marcelo Ebrard (2022, 2023)

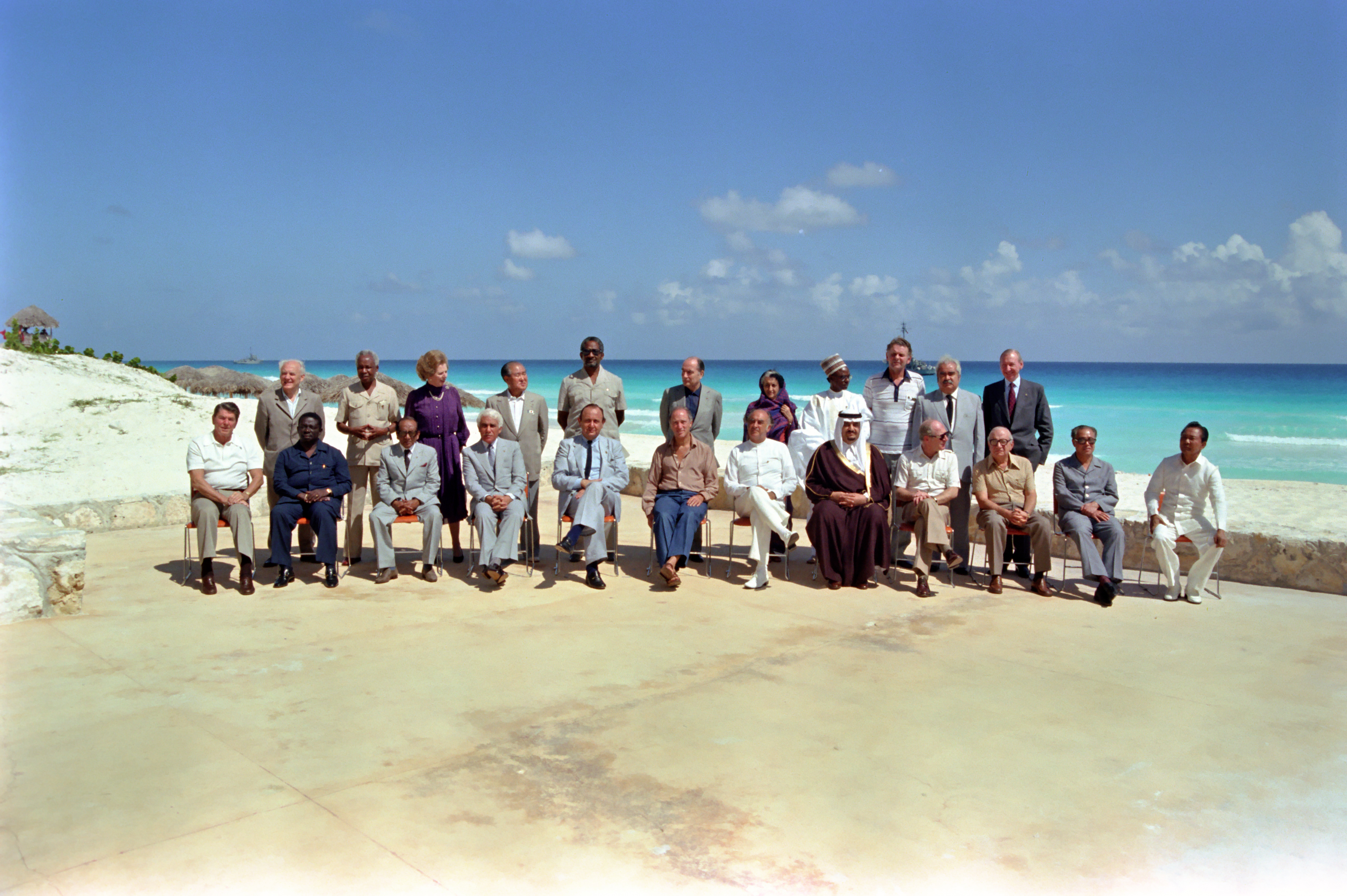
Prime Minister Indira Gandhi attending the North–South Summit in Cancún along with her Mexican counterpart President José López Portillo; 1981.

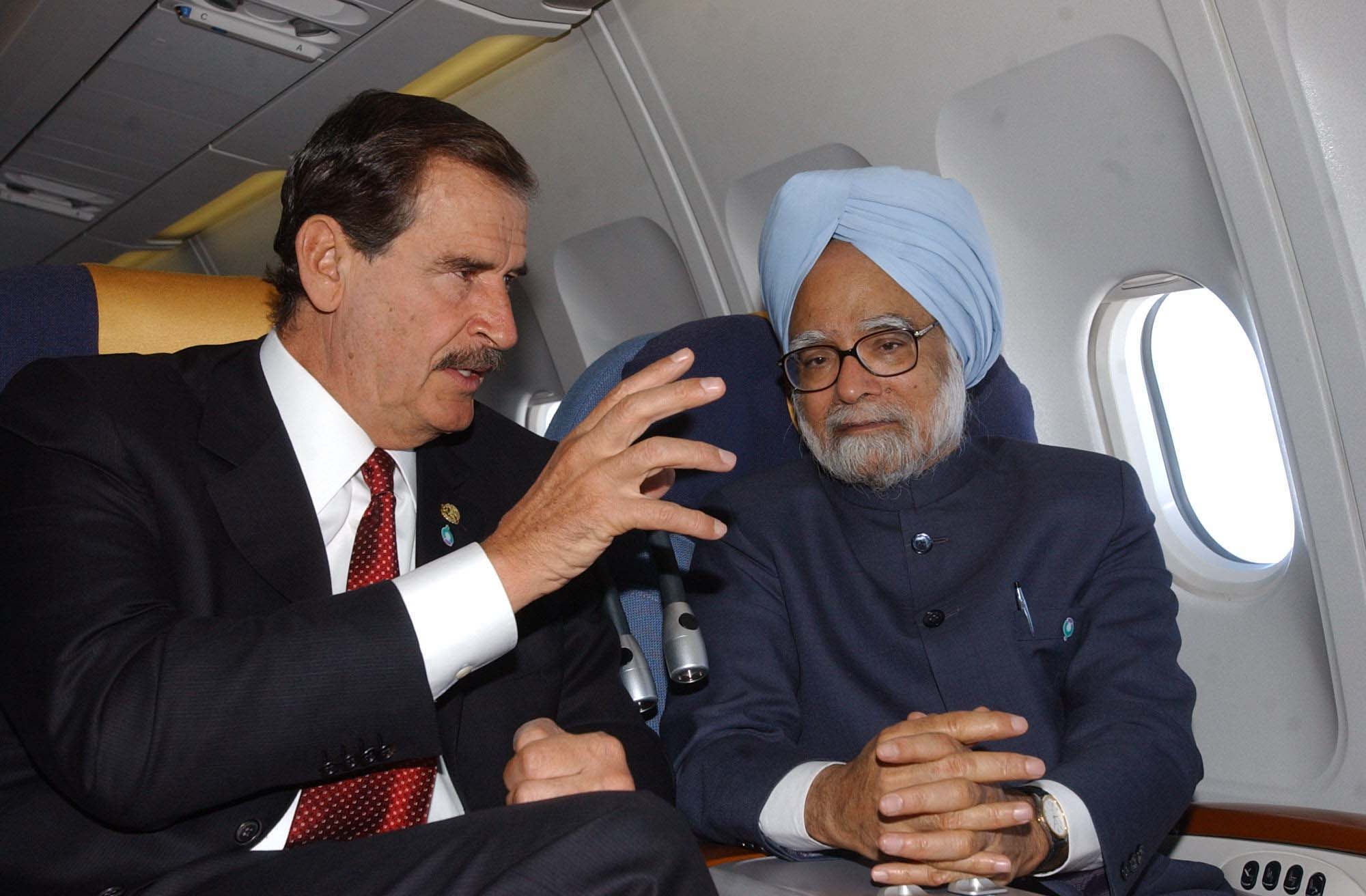
President Vicente Fox and Prime Minister Manmohan Singh flying to Scotland to attend the 31st G8 summit; 2005.

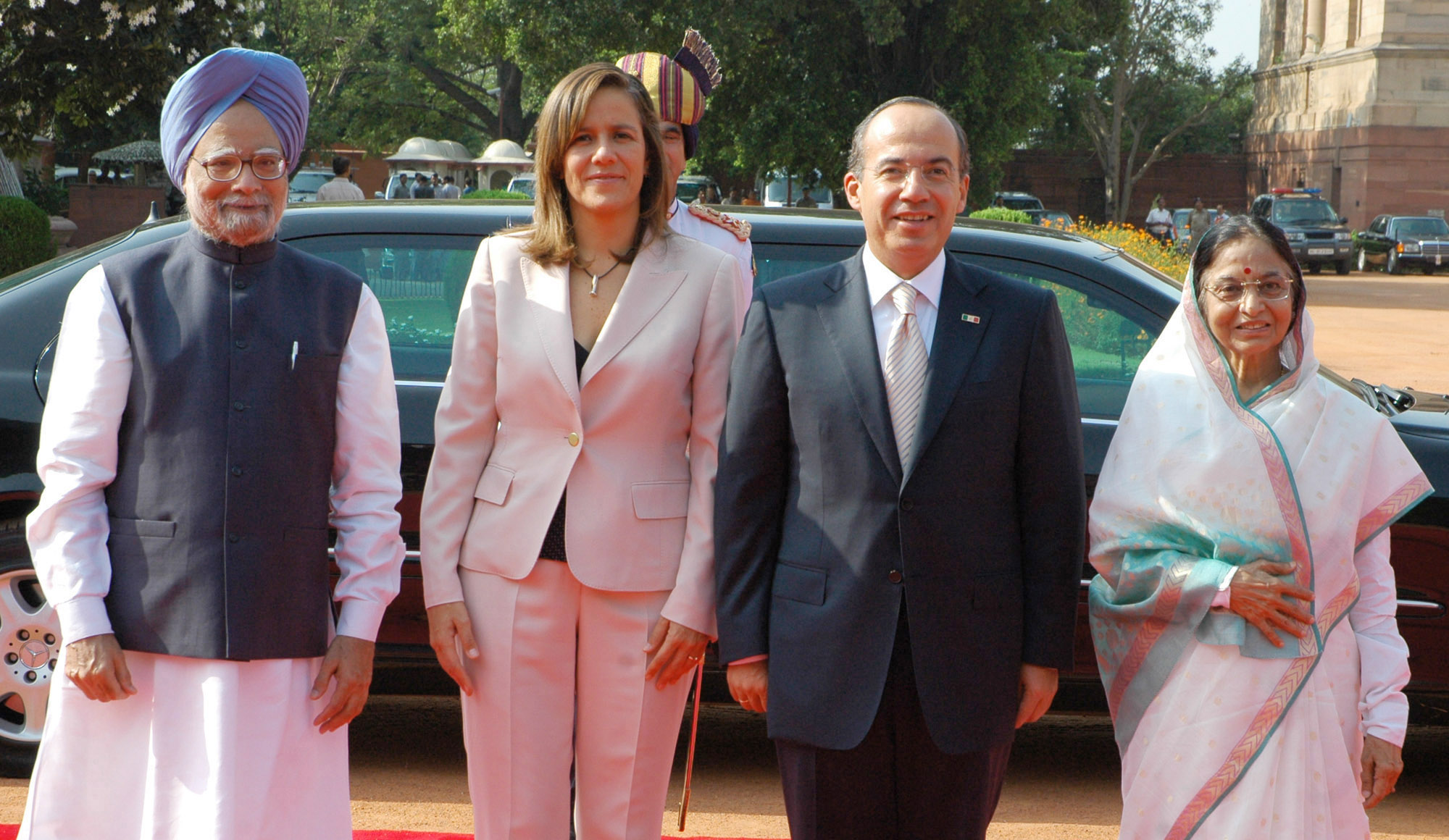
Prime Minister Manmohan Singh, President Pratibha Patil, President Felipe Calderón and first lady Margarita Zavala in New Delhi, 2007.

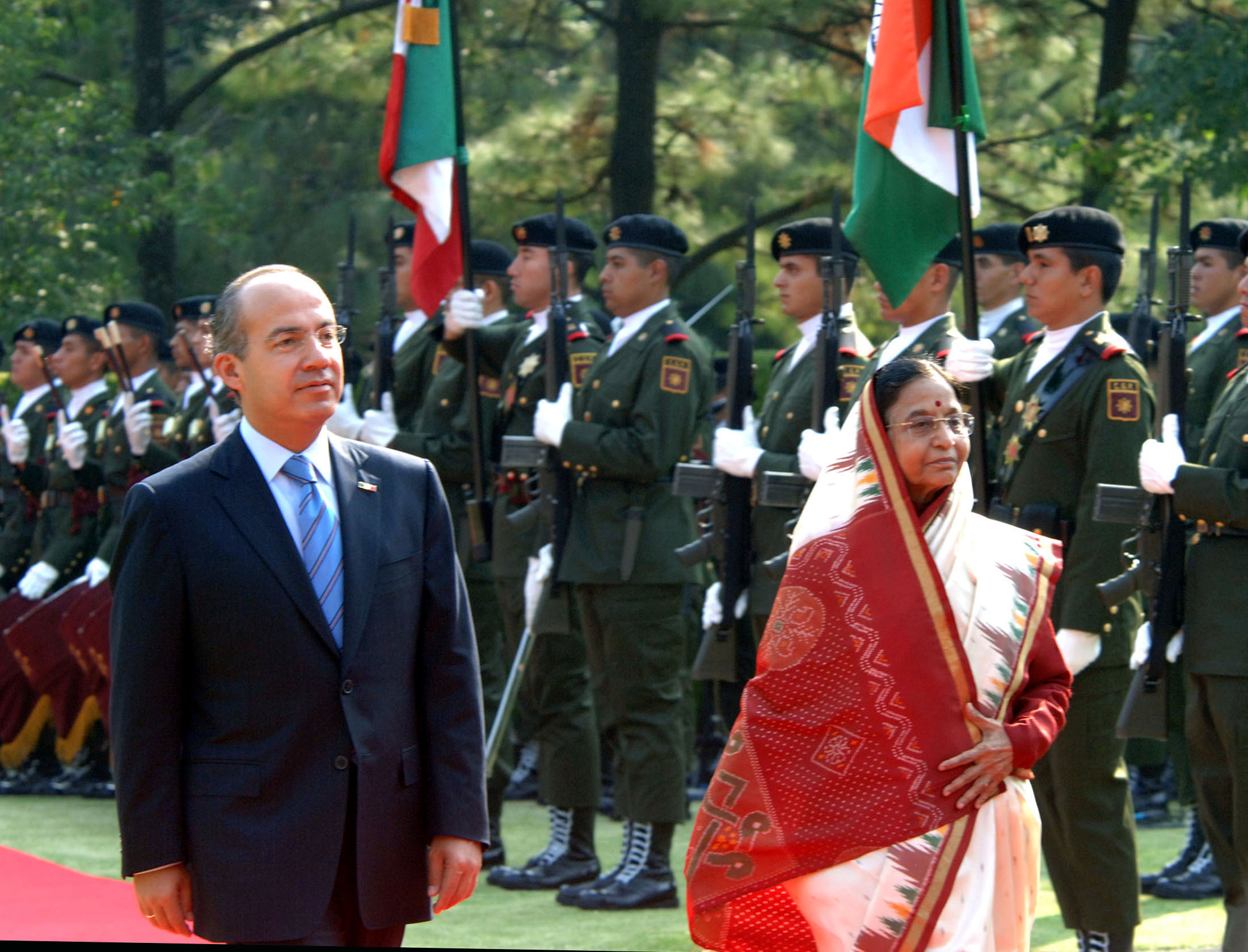
President Felipe Calderón and President Pratibha Patil in Mexico City; 2008.

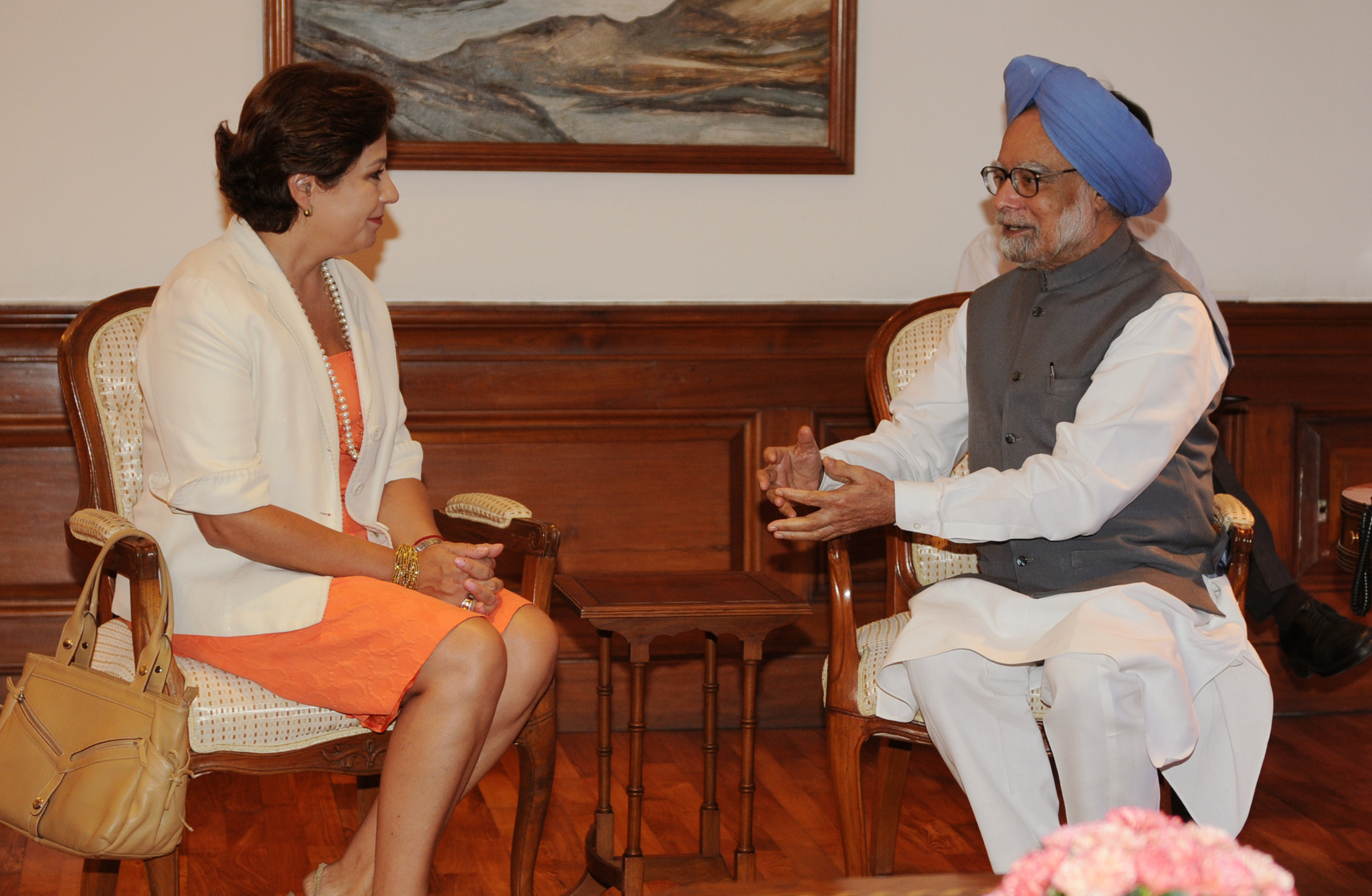
Foreign Secretary Patricia Espinosa and Prime Minister Manmohan Singh in New Delhi, 2010.

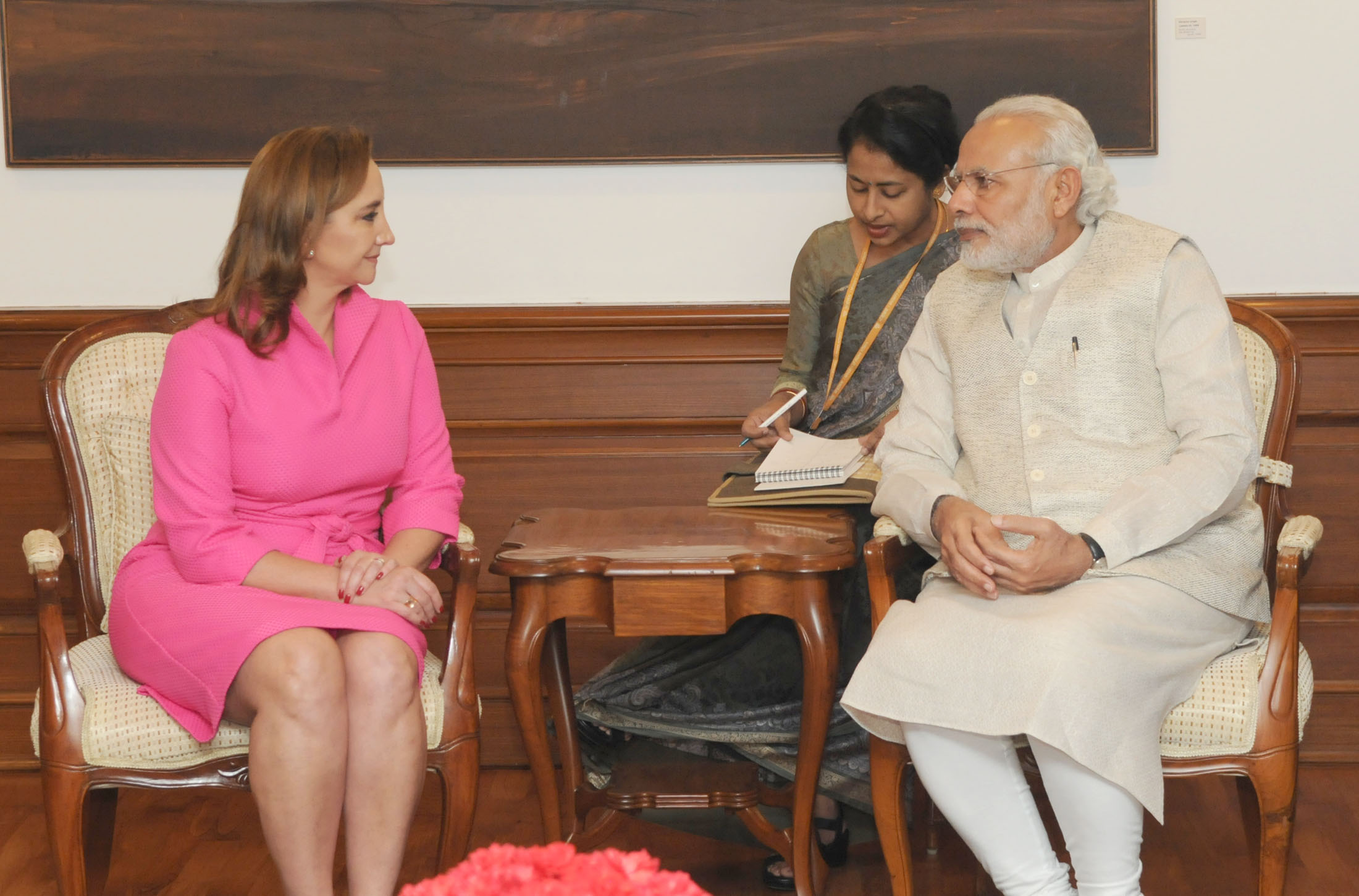
Foreign Secretary Claudia Ruiz Massieu and Prime Minister Narendra Modi in New Delhi, 2016.

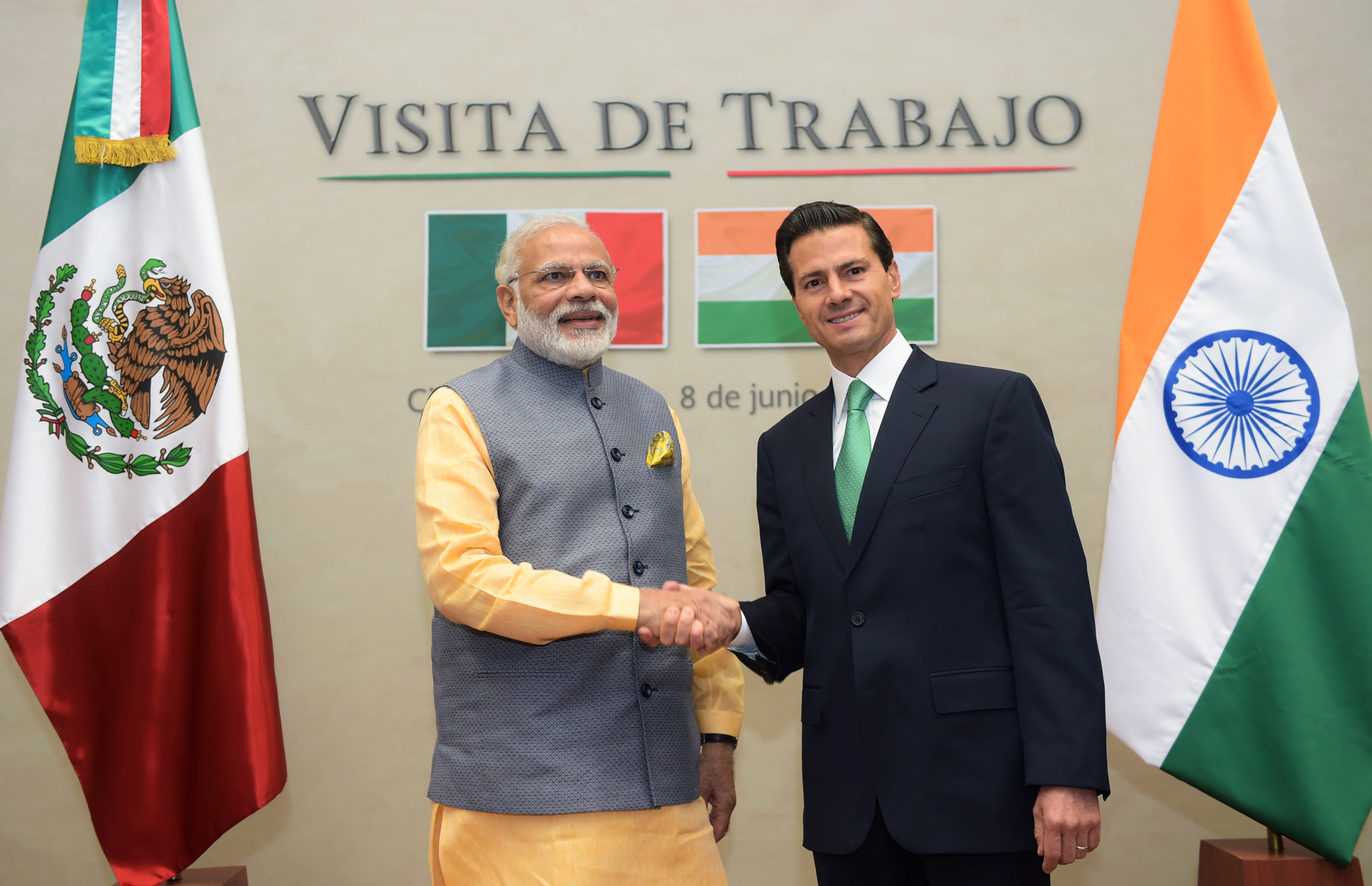
President Enrique Peña Nieto with Prime Minister Narendra Modi in Mexico City; 2016.

== Bilateral agreements ==
Both nations have signed numerous bilateral agreements such as an Agreement on Cultural Cooperation (1975); Agreement on Scientific and Technical Cooperation (1975); Agreement on Economic and Financial Cooperation (1982); Agreement on Touristic Cooperation (1996); Memorandum of Understanding on Communication Cooperation (1996); Agreement on Cultural and Educational Exchanges (2005); Agreement on Visa Exemption for Official and Diplomatic Passports (2005); Extradition treaty (2007); Agreement on the Promotion and Reciprocal Protection of Investments (2007); Agreement on Mutual Legal Assistance in Criminal Matters (2007); Agreement to Avoid Double Taxation and Prevent Tax Evasion in the Matter of Income Taxes (2007); Air service agreement (2008); Agreement on Mutual Administrative Assistance in Customs Matters (2012); and a Memorandum of Understanding between India’s Council of Scientific and Industrial Research (CSIR) and Mexican Agency for International Development Cooperation (AMEXCID) on expanding the programs of cooperation and exchange, particularly in areas of research, technological development and innovation (2023).

== Migration ==
The Indian community in Mexico is relatively small and estimated to be around 8,000; comprising mostly software engineers of Indian IT companies. There are several executives in the Indian and international companies, academics/professors in the local universities and some private businessmen in textile and garment business. There are also a few Indian restaurants have been running successfully in Mexico.

== Trade ==
In 2023, two-way trade between both nations amounted to US$8.6 billion. India's main exports to Mexico include: telephones and mobile phones, motors and motor vehicles, parts and accessories for motor vehicles, tires, electronics, medicines, chemical based products, clothing and footwear, aluminum and iron based materiales, diamonds, fruits, seeds, and spices. Mexico's main exports to India include: telephones and mobile phones, machinery, electronic integrated circuits, gold, chemical based products, scrap metal, parts and accessories for motor vehicles, minerals, and alcohol.

At least 17 Mexican companies have presence in India. Mexican multinational companies such as Cinépolis, Gruma, Grupo Bimbo, KidZania, Nemak, Orbia and Softtek (among others) operate in India. Over 200 Indian companies have presence in Mexico. Indian multinational companies such as HCLTech, Infosys, Lupin Limited, Sun Pharma, Tata Consultancy Services, and Wipro (among others) operate in Mexico.

== Resident diplomatic missions ==
of India in Mexico

- Mexico City (Embassy)

of Mexico in India

- New Delhi (Embassy)
- Mumbai (Consulate)

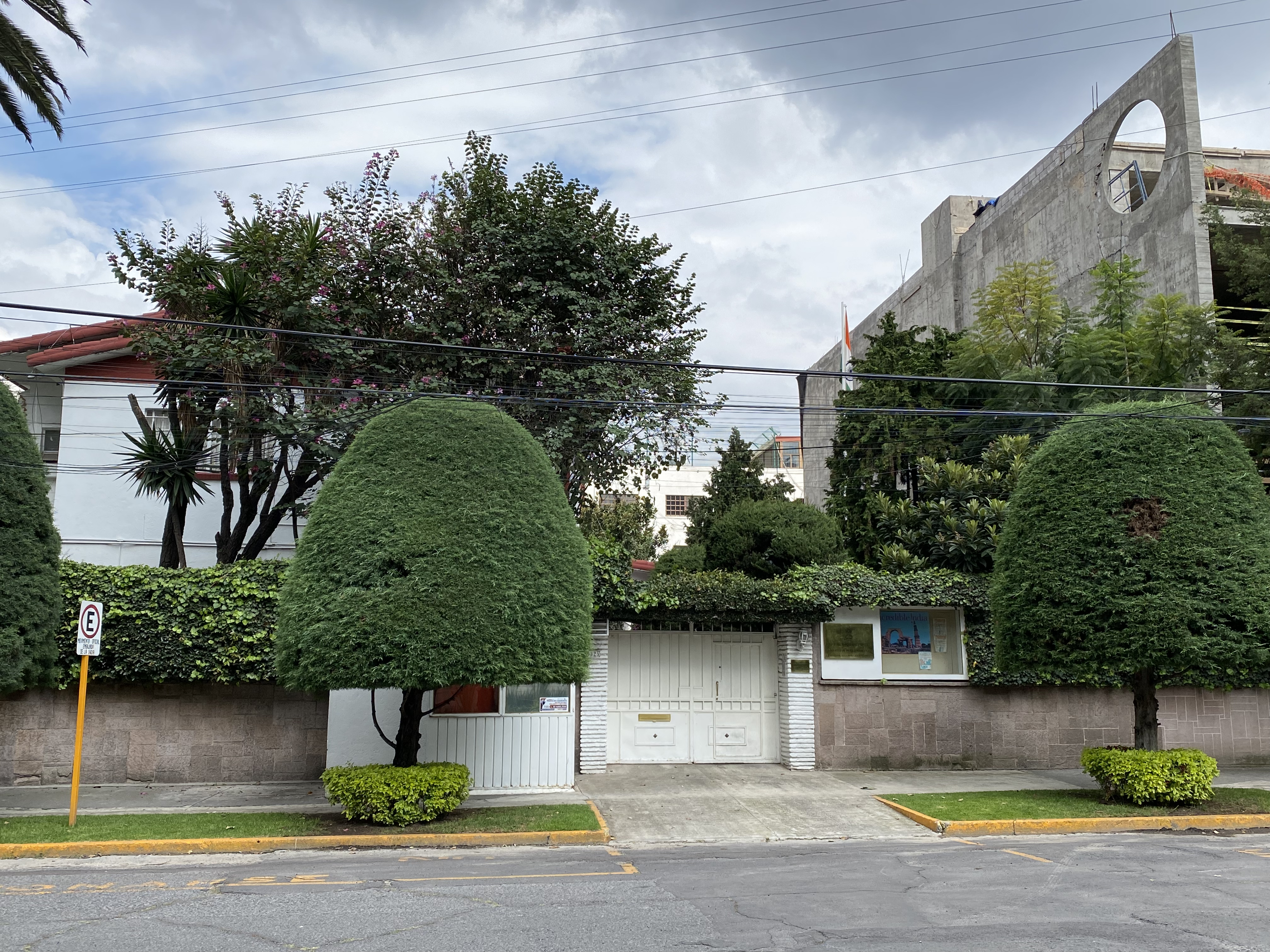
Embassy of India in Mexico City

== Gallery ==
President of India, Pratibha Patil, in front of the statue dedicated to Mahatma Gandhi in Mexico City

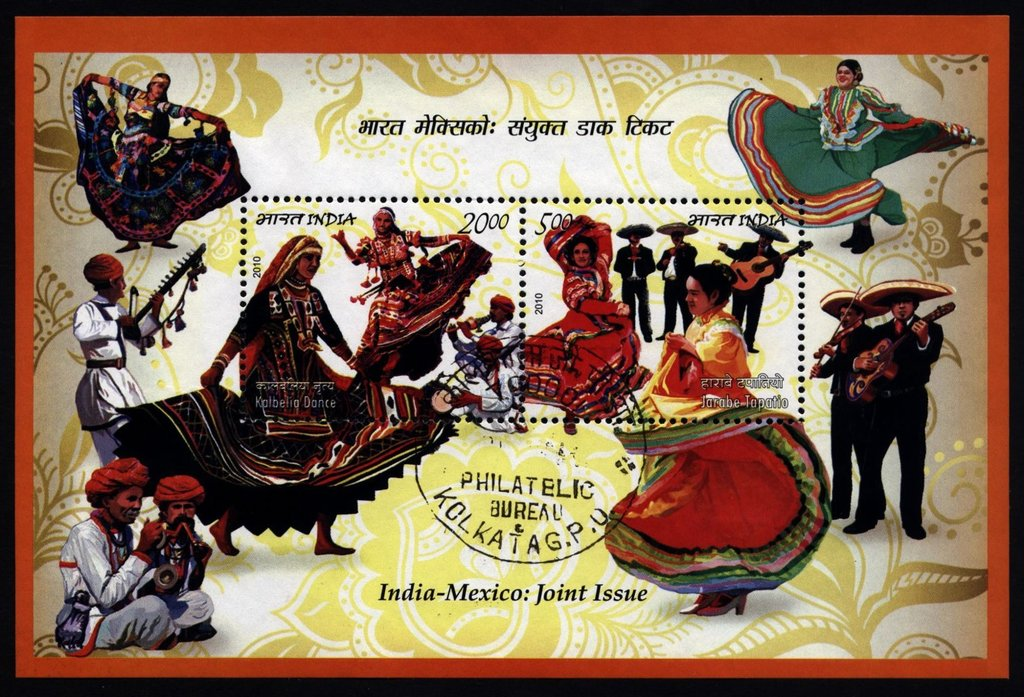
Stamp from India commemorating 60 years of diplomatic relations between India and Mexico

== See also ==
- Hinduism in Mexico
- Indian Mexicans
- Manabendra Nath Roy
- Punjabi Mexican Americans
