= India–Panama relations =

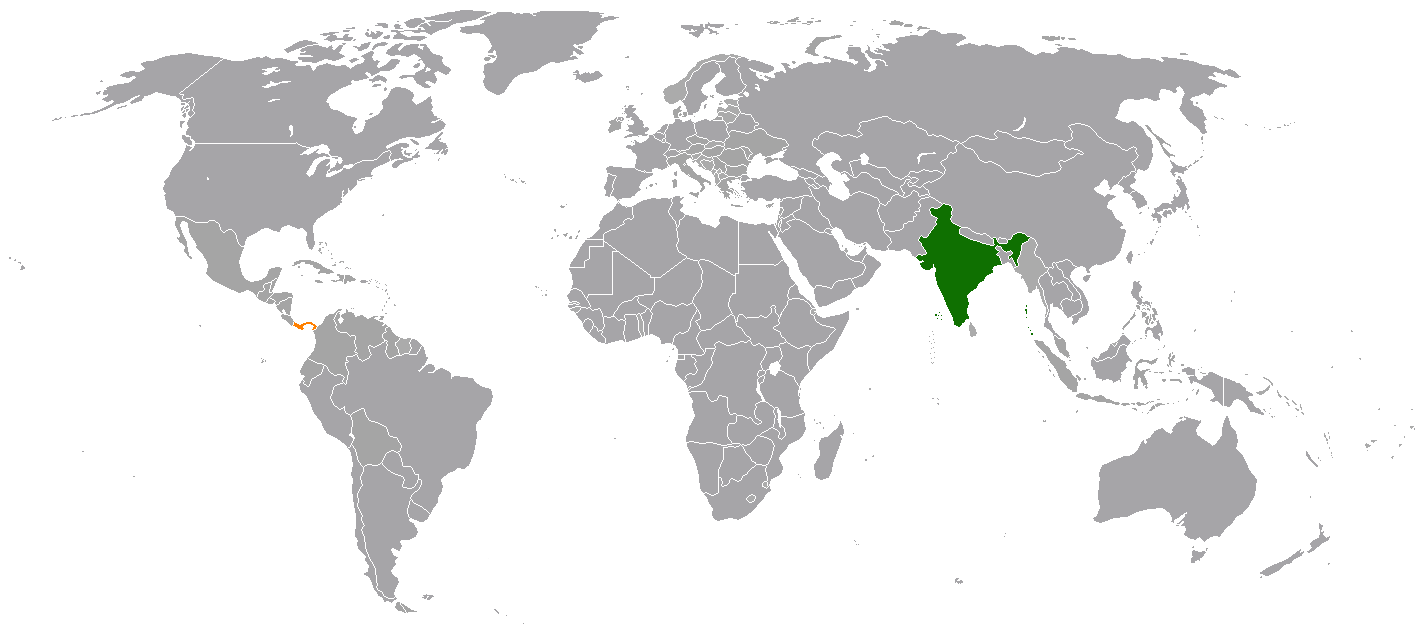
- India: Panama

India–Panama relations are the bilateral relations between India and Panama.

Panama is the first country in Central America where India established a resident embassy in 1973. Panama has an embassy in New Delhi, and a consulate-general in Mumbai.

== History ==
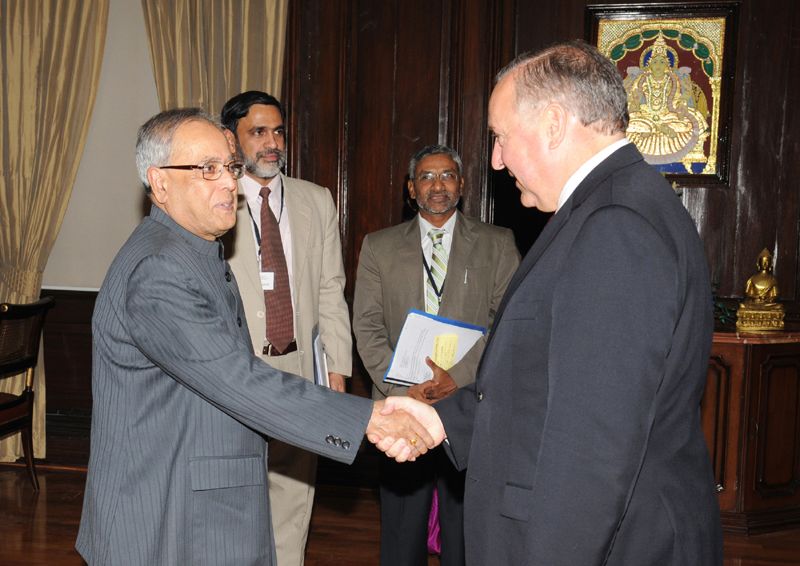
Finance Ministers Alberto Vallarino Clement and Pranab Mukherjee meeting in New Delhi in 2010.

The Indian-Panamanian connection is the oldest in the Central American region, dating back to the middle of the 19th century when groups of Indians, particularly Sikh immigrants, came to Panama to work on the construction of Panama railways and later the Panama Canal in the early 20th century.

There are more than 15,000 Indians, including those of Indian origin, in Panama, constituting the largest concentration of overseas Indians in Central America. The Indian community, predominantly from the Gujarat, is mostly involved in wholesale and retail trade.

A Gurdwara was built in 1986 in Panama City under the non-profit organization Sociedad Guru Nanak to serve as a place of worship for the Sikh Community in Panama. The growth of the Indian community has flourished with the constructions of the Gurdwara, Mandir, Mosques and Bahá'í Temple.

== Visas ==
Under the administration of President Ricardo Martinelli, the Government of Panama announced that Indian nationals who possess a visa for the US, Canada, Australia, or any country in the EU will be granted visa-free entry. Visa exemptions has also been granted to diplomats and officials for both the countries.

== High level visits ==
In November 2010, Alberto Vallarino Clement, Panamanian Minister of Economy and Finance visited India for the World Economic Forum meeting in New Delhi. Following the visit, India's Speaker of Parliament, Meira Kumar led a 20-member Parliamentary delegation to Panama in April 2011 to participate in the 124th Inter-Parliamentary Union (IPU) Assembly.

In 2011 and 2012, Indian government ministers Sachin Pilot, Vayalar Ravi, and E. Ahamed visited Panama. Milind Deora visited Panama in early 2013 to finalize a bilateral Maritime Cooperation Agreement between India and Panama. Also, cooperation over IT & E-Governance, cyber security and training, and Indian space agency ISRO's proposed TTC station in Panama were discussed.

The Vice President of India, Venkaiah Naidu paid a 2-day visit to the country in May 2018 along with the Minister of State for Tribal Affairs and other high level delegation representing various branches of the Indian Government. The President of Panama, Juan Carlos Varela broke protocol and accompanied the Vice President for the tour of the Panama Canal. Vice President Naidu also announced a total of $25 million of credit to set up centres of bio-diversity, drug tracking and also resources to develop the IT sector in Panama and also could expand into areas of agriculture, science & technology, space, pharmaceuticals and renewable energy. They also signed a memorandum to tackle various forms of terrorism. The President also reiterated support for India's bid for the permanent membership for the UN Security Council.

== Economic relations ==
Hoping to double trade with Latin America over the next five years, India is set to expand air and sea links with the region and negotiate more free trade agreements (FTAs). In light of the ongoing expansion of the Panama Canal, Air India has plans to make Panama the first destination for direct flights from India to Latin America, with direct twice-a-week service between New Delhi and Panama City by 2014 .

The biggest outward FDI from India in the summer of 2011 was to Panama by Gammon India, which pumped almost $2 billion into its Panama-based joint venture, Campo Puma Orient SA. The Shipping Corporation of India (SCI) has also established a joint venture in Panama with Japanese Mitsui O.S.K. Lines, Nippon Yusen, and K Line for servicing the transport of liquefied natural gas. This makes SCI the only Indian shipping company to enter the second LNG transportation business.

The main items of India's exports to Panama include textiles, automobiles and accessories, iron and steel, plastic products, pharmaceuticals, tobacco products, rubber products, furniture items, and electronic equipments. India's imports from Panama include mineral fuels, oils, waxes, ships, boats, and teak and other wooden articles.

In April 2013, over 120 leading Indian companies representing various sectors including automobiles, textiles, diamonds, electrical, and engineering goods, took part in the first-ever "Made-in-India" Exhibition at Expocomer, the biggest annual trade show in Panama. Amidst these growing commercial ties, India gave Panama a line of credit of US$10 million for establishing a Biodiversity and Drug Discovery Center in Panama City.

== Agreements ==
Several agreements have been signed, relating to cultural and educational co-operation, foreign office consultations, mutual cooperation between Foreign Service Institute, India and the Diplomatic Academy of Panama, and the Indian Ministry of Agriculture and the Panamanian Ministry of Agricultural Development.

== See also ==
- Foreign relations of India
- Foreign relations of Panama
- Indians in Panama
