= India–Venezuela relations =

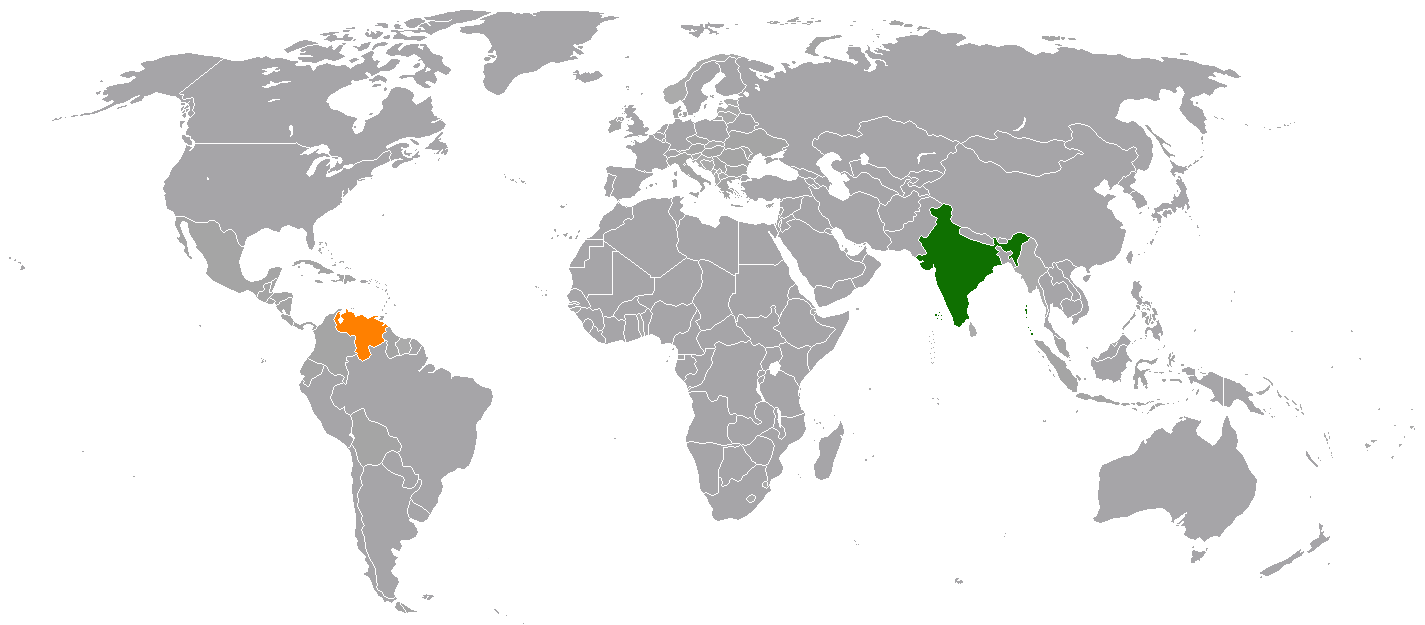
- India: Venezuela

Diplomatic mission
- Embassy of India in Caracas, Venezuela: Embassy of Venezuela in New Delhi, India

Envoy
- Indian Ambassador to Venezuela P. K. Ashok Babu: Venezuelan Ambassador to India Mrs Capaya Rodriguez Gonzalez

India–Venezuela relations are the international relations that exist between the Republic of India and the Bolivarian Republic of Venezuela.

== History ==
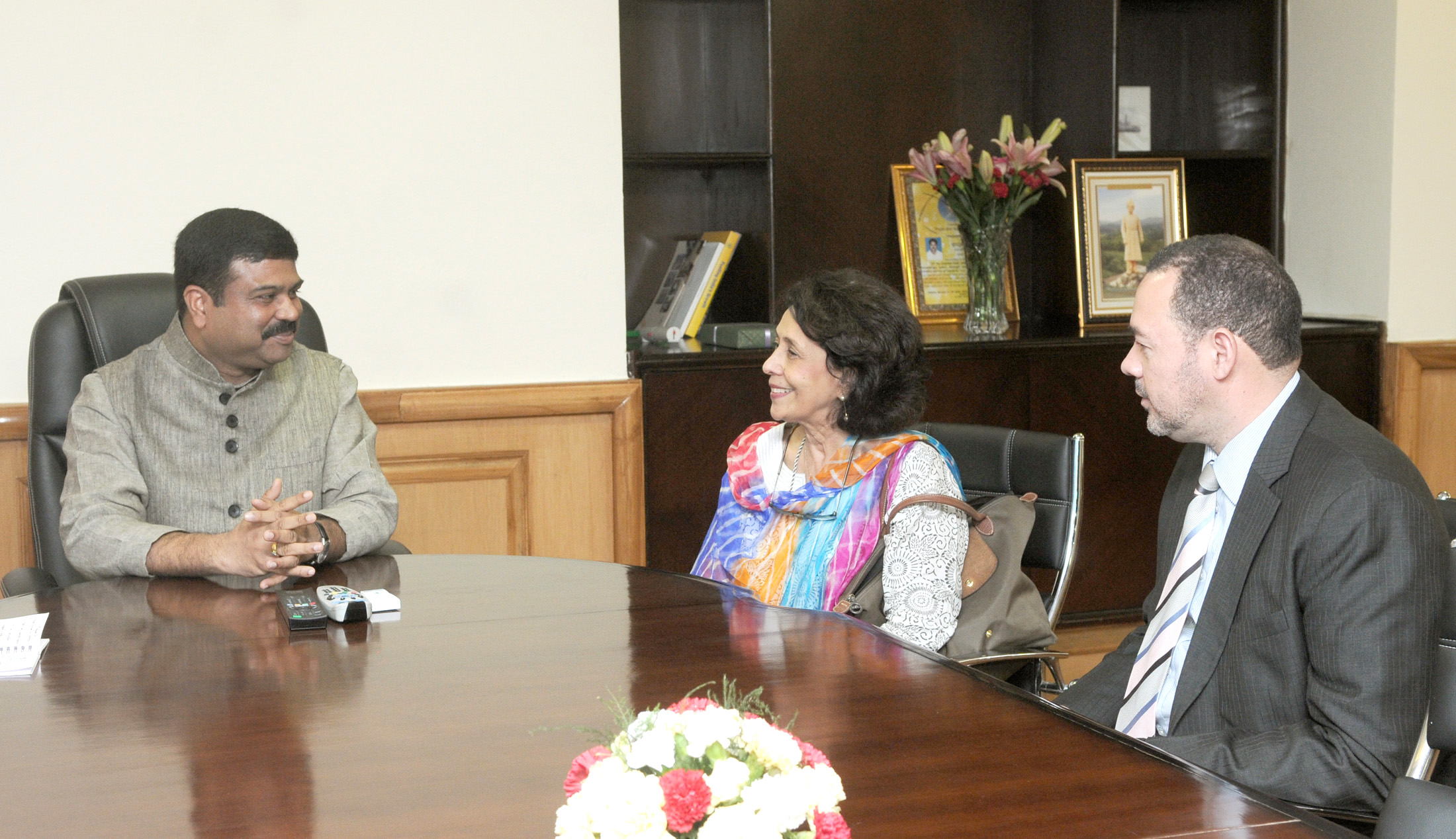
The Ambassador of Venezuela to India, Mrs Milena Santana meets Minister of State for Petroleoum and Natural Gas, Shri Dharmendrea Pradhan in the city of New Delhi.

Diplomatic relations between India and Venezuela were established on 1 October 1959. India maintains an embassy in Caracas, while Venezuela maintains an embassy in New Delhi.

There have been several visits by heads of state and government, and other high-level officials between the countries. President Hugo Chávez visited New Delhi on 4–7 March 2005. Chávez met with Indian President APJ Abdul Kalam and Prime Minister Manmohan Singh. The two countries signed six agreements including one to establish a Joint Commission to promote bilateral relations and another on cooperation in the hydrocarbon sector. Foreign Minister Nicolás Maduro visited India to attend the First Meeting of the India-CELAC Troika Foreign Ministers meeting in New Delhi on 7 August 2012.

The Election Commission of India (ECI) and the National Electoral Council (CNE) of Venezuela signed an MoU during a visit by Indian Election Commissioner V S Sampath to Caracas in 2012. Minister of State for Corporate Affairs visited Venezuela to attend the state funeral of President Chavez in March 2013. The President and Prime Minister of India expressed condolences on the death of Chávez. The Rajya Sabha, the upper house of Parliament, observed a minute's silence to mark his death. Ambassador Smita Purushottam represented India at the swearing-in ceremony of Chávez's successor Nicolás Maduro on 19 April 2013. During a visit from June 3–6, 2026, Venezuela’s Acting President Delcy Rodríguez met with Indian Prime Minister Narendra Modi in New Delhi to rebuild bilateral ties and expand energy, mining, and economic cooperation.

Citizens of Venezuela are eligible for scholarships under the Indian Technical and Economic Cooperation Programme and the Indian Council for Cultural Relations.

== Economic relations ==
=== Trade ===
India surpassed China as the largest Asian importer of crude oil from Venezuela in 2012. Venezuela is India's seventh largest source of crude oil after Iraq, Saudi Arabia, United Arab Emirates, Nigeria, United States and Kuwait accounting for 3.4% of the country's oil imports in March–December 2020. In the preceding decade, India became the third largest importer of oil in the world, after the United States and China. Following unrest in West Asia, its traditional source of oil, India looked to diversify its sources of oil imports. The rise in US domestic oil production resulted in an 87% reduction of American oil imports from Venezuela in 2019, creating an opportunity for India to increase crude oil imports from Venezuela.

As crude oil imports form the bulk of bilateral trade, the total value of trade is heavily dependent on crude oil prices. Bilateral trade between India and Venezuela totalled US$2.79 billion in 2020-21. This was much lower than the $5.241 billion, $6.563 billion and $5.728 billion recorded in 2017-18, 2018–19 and 2019–20 respectively. In 2020, crude oil exports from Venezuela to India stood at $2 billion, while non-oil exports from Venezuela accounted for just $27.9 million. Apart from crude oil, the other major commodities India imports from Venezuela are Scrap Iron and Scrap Copper.

India's total exports to Venezuela in 2020 totaled $758 million, rising from $241 million the previous fiscal. The main commodities exported by India to Venezuela are refined petroleum, packaged medicaments, blood, antisera, vaccines, toxins and cultures, Heavy Mixed Woven Cotton, machinery such as Electric Generating sets and Engine parts and Pesticides.

In 2024, bilateral trade between India and Venezuela totaled $2.257 billion, with Venezuela maintaining a $1.82 billion trade surplus. Venezuelan exports to India reached $2.04 billion (making India its second-largest export destination) led by crude petroleum ($1.76 billion), petroleum coke ($167 million), and scrap aluminium ($32.5 million). Conversely, Indian exports to Venezuela totaled $217 million, led by packaged medicaments ($92.8 million), vaccines, blood, antisera, toxins, and cultures ($14.5 million), and unglazed ceramics ($13.3 million). In August 2026, monthly bilateral trade recorded $577 million in Venezuelan exports to India and $34.7 million in Indian exports to Venezuela.

=== Hydrocarbons ===
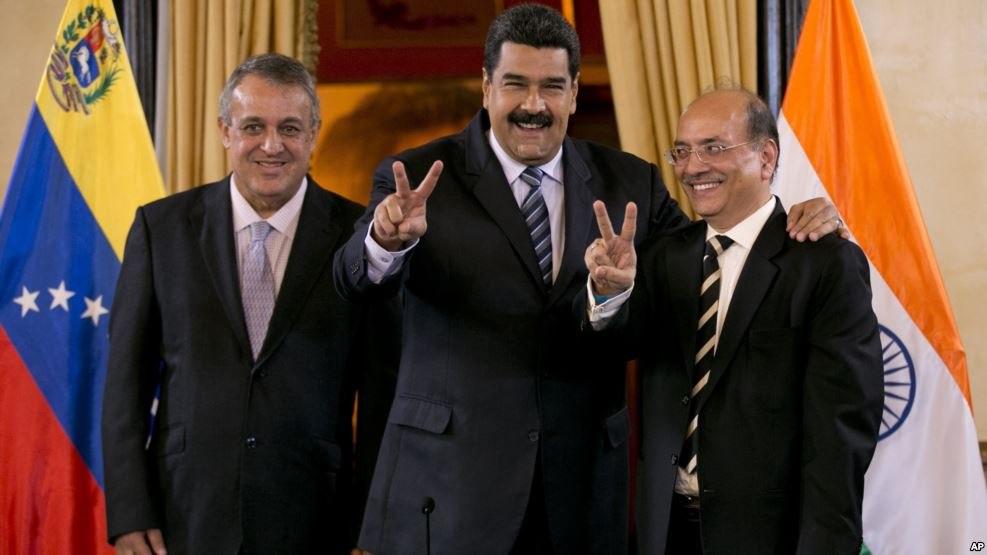
Venezuelan President Nicolás Maduro, ONGC Executive Director Narendra Kumar Verma, and PDVSA President Eulogio Del Pino in Caracas; November 2016.

According to Rejaul Karim Laskar, a scholar of India'a foreign policy, the most important aspect of India–Venezuela relations relates to hydrocarbons. Venezuela has world's largest reserve of crude oil, while India is world's third largest importer of crude oil.

During President Chávez's visit to India in March 2005, the two countries signed a bilateral agreement on co-operation in the hydrocarbon sector and an MoU granting ONGC Videsh Ltd (OVL) rights for oil and gas exploration in Venezuela. OVL subsequently opened an office in Venezuela. In April 2008, OVL and PDVSA established a joint venture called Petrolera IndoVenezolana SA for exploration and production oil in the San Cristóbal field. OVL has a 40% stake in the company and the remaining 60% is held by PDVSA. OVL helped certify heavy oil reserves in the Orinoco river belt in 2010.

In February 2010, an international consortium including Indian state-owned oil companies won a global bid to claim 40% stake worth $1.05 billion in the Carabobo-1 oil field, giving India the capability to produce 400,000 barrels of crude oil per day. Three Indian firms - OVL, Indian Oil Corporation (IOC), Oil India Ltd (OIL) - are part of the consortium, along with Repsol of Spain and Petronas of Malaysia. The three Indian firms own a combined 18% stake in the Carinobo oil field.

India is among the few countries with the capability to refine Venezuelan crude oil. Venezuelan crude oil requires special processing because of its inferior quality compared to Middle Eastern crude oil as the former is heavier and contains more sulfur. Reliance Industries Limited (RIL) secured a 15-year crude supply contract with PDVSA to import 400,000 barrels of oil per day, for processing at its twin refineries at Jamnagar, Gujarat. Essar is another major importer of oil from Venezuela.

India and Venezuela signed an agreement to double production at the San Cristóbal oil field in November 2016.

=== Pharmaceuticals ===
Several Indian pharmaceutical firms such as Sun Pharma, Dr Reddy's Laboratories, Glenmark, Claris, and Cipla operate in Venezuela. Cipla has 120 medications approved to market in Venezuela as of 2013, and made nearly $15 million in revenue in the year 2006. Half of all HIV patients in Venezuela used at least one Cipla drug in 2006.

Indian pharmaceutical firms have been able to take advantage of the severe shortage of basic medicines in Venezuela, which the Venezuelan Pharmaceutical Federation estimated to be around 70%. Indian firms exported $140 million worth of medicines to Venezuela in 2014–15. The Venezuelan market is so important to Indian firms that domestic politics can affect their share prices. For instance, shares of Glenmark and Dr Reddy's fell by 5% and 2% respectively following the 2015 general elections and the expectation of currency devaluation in Venezuela. Due to currency controls placed on the economy by the Venezuelan government, Indian firms have been unable to repatriate revenue from their Venezuelan subsidiaries since 2013. Dr Reddy's Laboratories had to write-off $64.7 million in the fourth quarter of FY16 due to currency restrictions placed by the Venezuelan government, and the company was only permitted to repatriate $4 million in that quarter.

== Cultural relations ==
The National Assembly of Venezuela passed a unanimous resolution in honour of Sathya Sai Baba following his death in 2011

== Indian Embassy in Venezuela ==
India has an Embassy located in Caracas, Venezuela.

• India appointed Shri P.K. Ashok Babu as an Ambassador to Venezuela in July 2023. Ashok has previously represented India as a Consul General in the Consulate General of India, Cape Town, South Africa.

== Venezuelan Embassy in India ==
Venezuela has an Embassy located in New Delhi, India.

• Venezuelan Ambassador to India is Mrs Capaya Rodriguez Gonzalez.

== Indians in Venezuela ==
As of July 2016, there are about 50 Indian families living Venezuela, of which about 35 reside in Caracas. The Indian Association of Venezuela, which was dormant since 1997, and revived in 2003, organises celebrations for Indian festivals such as Deepavali and Holi for members of the Indian community as well as Venezuelans. Most of the Indian community are businessmen, employees of oil companies, and professionals.

== Resident diplomatic missions ==
- India has an embassy in Caracas.
- Venezuela has an embassy in New Delhi.

== See also ==
- Embassy of India, Caracas
- Indians in Venezuela
