= Ampatigri =

Village in India

Coordinates: 25.497°N 89.960°E

Ampatigri village is located in Betasing Tehsil of South West Garo Hills district in Meghalaya in India.
