= Laskar Committee Report =

Indian government committee

The Laskar Committee was a one-man Committee which was constituted by the Chairman of the Minority Department of All India Congress Committee (AICC) in October 2016 to formulate and suggest a strategy to attract Christians, Muslims, Buddhists and other religious minorities belonging to the North East region of India towards the Indian National Congress party. The committee was headed by a Congress ideologue and prominent author and scholar from the Northeast Indian state Assam Rejaul Karim Laskar.

== Background ==
The Northeast region of India has traditionally been a stronghold of the Congress party since India's independence. However, since the inauguration of the Modi Government at the centre, the BJP started to challenge Congress party's dominance in the region. By mid 2016, BJP had replaced two Congress government's in the region, first in Arunachal Pradesh and then in Assam. To make matters worse for the Congress, the BJP not only gave call for making the region "Congress Mukt" (free from Congress) but also constituted a regional panel named as North East Democratic Alliance with the avowed aim of eliminating the Congress from the region. Under the circumstances, the Congress central leadership woke up to the need to formulate an effective strategy to deal with the challenge and to retain its support base in the region. Consequently, Congress ideologue and prominent author and scholar from Assam Rejaul Karim Laskar was roped in to formulate a strategy to consolidate Congress party's support base among the religious minorities of the region- especially the Christians.

== Controversy ==
India's ruling party BJP has criticized this move of the Congress party. BJP national Spokesperson Nalin Kohli has been quoted as saying, "The move to attract Christians, Muslims, and other communities ...has only confirmed that the Congress has a communal agenda...".

== Report ==
After holding extensive consultations with Congress party leaders of the region as well as civil society leaders including prominent Church leaders of the region, the Committee submitted its 148-page report to the AICC in April 2017. The main part of the report consisted of seven chapters. The chapter seven of the report contained recommendations.

== Recommendations ==
The major recommendations of the committee are:

-Greater representations to the Christians from the region.

-Creation of a North East Congress Minority Coordination Committee.

- Holding of an "Annual North East Dialogue".

-"Proper" representation to people belonging to Donyi-Polo, Sanamahi and Niam-Khasi/Niamtre religions.
