= Hinduism in Panama =

Hindus in Panama
Total population
- 14,000 (2021)▲; 0.32% of total population

Regions with significant populations
- All Over Panama

Religions
- Hinduism

Related ethnic groups
- Indians in Panama and Hindus

Hinduism in Panama is a minority religion. There are about 14,000 (0.32%) Hindus in Panama as of 2021.

== History ==
The Hindus initially arrived by way of the British colonies of Guyana and Trinidad-Tobago, first came as canal workers between 1904 and 1913. Most of the Hindus trace their roots back to the states of Gujarat and Sindh, in India and Pakistan respectively.

== Demographics ==
Historical Population
Year	Pop.	±%
2001	9,269	—
2008	8,281	−10.7%
2009	10,000	+20.8%
2021	14,000	+40.0%

Year	Percent	Increase
2001	0.30%	-
2008	0.29%	-0.01%
2009	0.27%	-0.02%
2021	0.32%	+0.05%

== Hindu Associations and Organisations ==
The main association of Hindus in Panama are the Panamanian Hindu Civic Association, the Krishna Radha Temple Society, the Hindustani Society of Panama (Templo Hindu de Tumba Muerto), the Hindustani Society of Colón. The International Society for Krishna Consciousness, International Sri Sathya Sai Baba Organization, and International Society of Transcendental Meditation are also present in Panama.

== Panama Hindu Temple ==
Panama Hindu Temple is one of only two Hindu Temples in Panama, and stands on top of a hill in Tumba Muerto.

== See also ==
- Indians in Panama
- Hinduism in Suriname
- Hinduism in Trinidad and Tobago
- Hinduism in French Guiana
