= Mukul Sangma =

Indian politician

Mukul M. Sangma
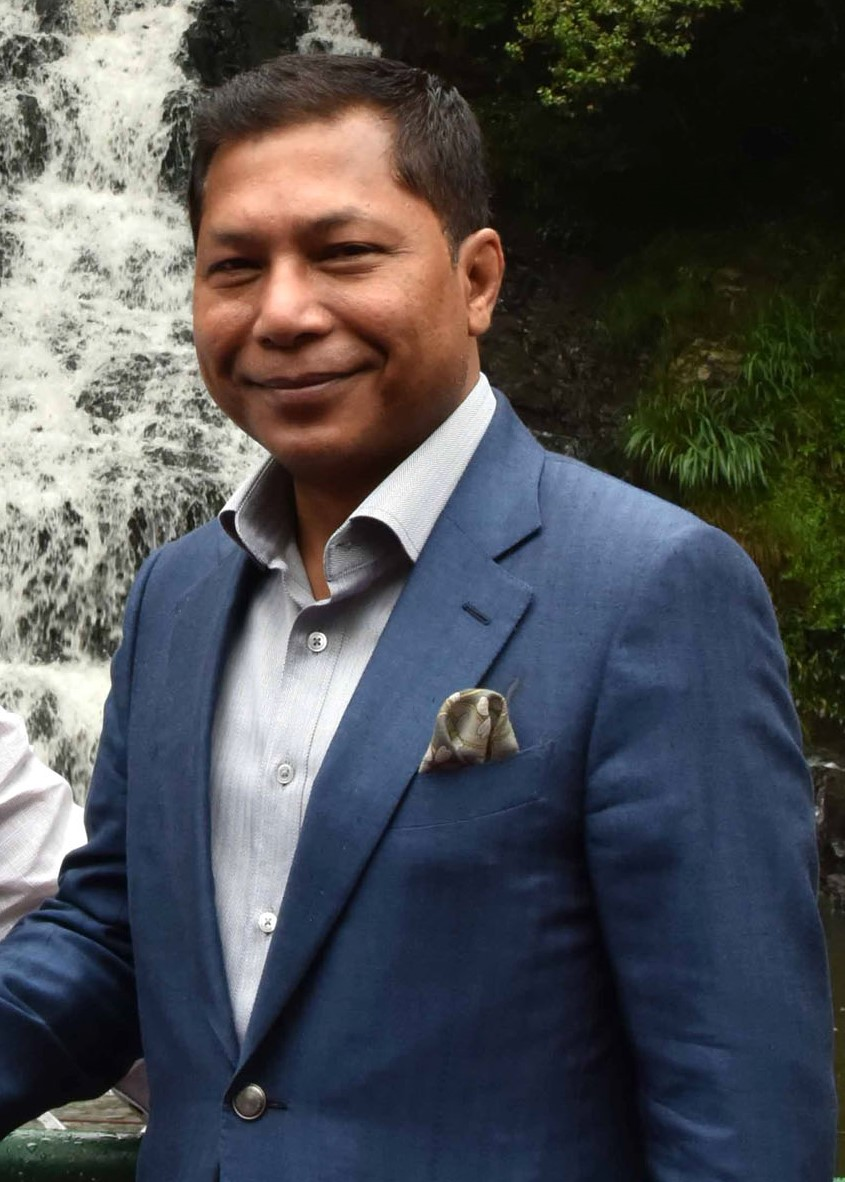
- Official Portrait, 2014

Leader of the Opposition Meghalaya Legislative Assembly
- Incumbent
- Assumed office July 2024

11th Chief Minister of Meghalaya
- In office 20 April 2010 – 6 March 2018
- Deputy: Roytre C. Laloo; Rowell Lyngdoh (until 2016)
- Preceded by: D. D. Lapang
- Succeeded by: Conrad Sangma

Member of the Meghalaya Legislative Assembly
- Incumbent
- Assumed office 6 March 2018
- Constituency: Songsak

Deputy Chief Minister of Meghalaya
- In office 13 May 2009 – 19 April 2010
- Succeeded by: Bindo Lanong
- In office 11 March 2007 – 4 March 2008
- In office 11 April 2005 – 6 October 2005

Personal details
- Born: 20 April 1965 (age 61) Ampatigri
- Party: Mamata All India Trinamool Congress (2026–present)
- Other political affiliations: Trinamool Congress (2021–2026); Indian National Congress (1998–2021)
- Education: Regional Institute of Medical Sciences
- Profession: Physician; Politician

Mukul Manda Sangma (born 20 April 1965) is an Indian politician and physician who was the 11th Chief Minister of Meghalaya from 2010 to 2018 and also served as leader of the house in legislative assembly and now currently leader of the opposition in the Meghalaya Legislative Assembly since July 2024. Sangma also served as Deputy Chief Minister of Meghalaya from 2009 to 2010, 2007 to 2008 and 2005 to 2005. He has been a member of the Trinamool Congress since November 2021; previously, he was a longtime member of the Indian National Congress.

== Early life and career ==
Sangma was born on 20 April 1965, son of teachers Binoy Bhushan M. Marak and Roshanara Begum at Ampatigiri, now the headquarters of South West Garo Hills district. In 1990, he graduated in medicine from the Regional Institute of Medical Sciences in Imphal in 1990, and joined Zikzak Public Health Centre as a health and medical officer in 1991.

== Political career ==
In 1993, Sangma was elected to the Meghalaya Legislative Assembly from Ampatigiri as an independent candidate, following which he was appointed the Chairman of the Meghalaya Transport Corporation. Sangma was re-elected to the Meghalaya Legislative Assembly in 1998, 2003, 2008, 2013, 2018 as a representative of the Indian National Congress.

He held office as the Parliamentary Secretary for the Government of Meghalaya between the years 1996 and 1998.

In 2003, he became the home and education minister in the D. D. Lapang government. He was also appointed the Deputy Chief Minister of Meghalaya in 2005.

In May 2009, he became the Deputy Chief Minister of Meghalaya, acting as a representative of the Indian National Congress-led Meghalaya United Alliance (MUA) government.

In April 2010, Sangma took oath as the 11th Chief Minister of Meghalaya, following the resignation of DD Lapang. He was sworn in for a second straight term in March 2013.

Sangma was named as one of the candidates for the 2018 Assembly elections in Meghalaya, contesting seats from the Songsak and Ampati constituencies in which he won from both. Currently, he serves as the Leader of Opposition in Meghalaya Legislative Assembly. His successor as Chief Minister in 2018 was Conrad Sangma, who is not related to him.

Mukul Sangma and 11 other Congress MLAs joined the Trinamool Congress (TMC) in November 2021, making the TMC the main opposition party in the state. He contested 2023 Assembly elections in Meghalaya as an AITC candidate, contesting seats from the Songsak and Tikrikilla constituencies, in which he won in Songsak and lost in Tikrikilla.

== Key Schemes & Initiatives ==
In 2015, Sangma launched the Meghalaya Health Insurance Scheme, a scheme to provide health coverage to families that live below the poverty line. He launched Phase 2 in 2015, which aimed at providing comprehensive health coverage to the citizens of the state.

Sangma has launched multiple social assistance programmes, including the Special Wedding Assistance Scheme for orphaned girls over the age of 18 and a programme for providing aid to single mothers and orphaned girls.

In 2017, Sangma launched the Life Programme (Livelihood Intervention and Facilitation of Entrepreneurship), aimed towards empowering people for economic prosperity. He also laid the foundations for the Shillong Government College of Engineering, the first engineering college in the state of Meghalaya, followed by two more colleges at Mawlai and Tura.

He launched "Mission Football", an initiative to promote sports in Meghalaya and develop the sports at a grassroots level.

In 2018, he launched a Career Guidance Program to offer specialized coaching support for underprivileged students.

== Positions held ==
- Elected to Meghalaya Legislative Assembly in 1993, 1998, 2003, 2008, 2013, 2018 and 2023.
- Parliamentary Secretary of the Government of Meghalaya between 1996 and 1998.
- Home and Education Minister of Meghalaya in 2003.
- Deputy Chief Minister of Meghalaya in 2005 and 2009.
- Chief Minister of Meghalaya from 2010 to 2018

== Personal life ==
Sangma is married to Dikkanchi D. Shira, who was an MLA, and has 4 children. His eldest daughter, Miani D. Shira, and his brother, Zenith Sangma, are also politicians.

== Notes ==
Political offices
Preceded by D. D. Lapang	Chief Minister of Meghalaya; 20 April 2010 – 06 March 2018	Succeeded by Conrad Sangma
