= Rejaul Karim Laskar =

Indian politician

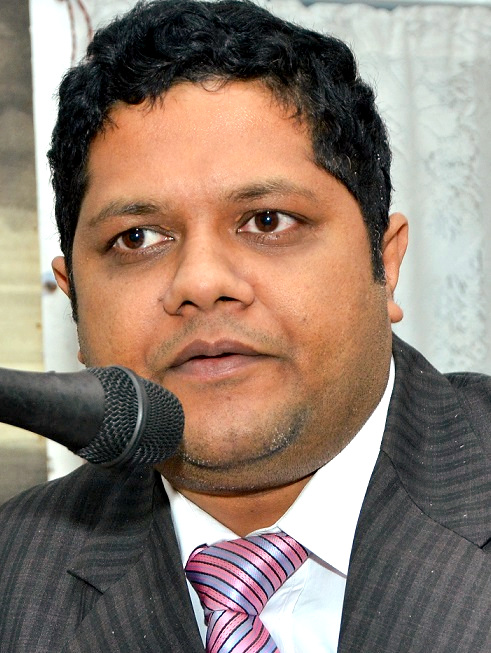
Rejaul Karim Laskar

Rejaul Karim Laskar is an Indian politician and scholar of India's foreign policy. He is a former Congress ideologue and has written extensively on the policies of the United Progressive Alliance governments. He is also a scholar of India's foreign policy and diplomacy with his scholarly work having been recognized as constituting "a major contribution to contemporary diplomatic history of India".

He is the former Secretary of AICC Vichar Vibhag (the Intellectual Department of the All India Congress Committee) and former Spokesperson of Assam Pradesh Congress Committee.

He has also served in the past, in the capacity of Observer (Minority Department) of the All India Congress Committee for the three states of Meghalaya, Nagaland and Mizoram.

Currently, he is the Director of the Centre for Advanced International Studies at the University of Science & Technology, Meghalaya, India.

== Education ==
Rejaul Karim Laskar completed a Bachelor of Engineering from Regional Engineering College, Silchar (Presently known as NIT Silchar). Then he received his M.Phil. and Ph.D. from the School of International Studies of Jawaharlal Nehru University, New Delhi. His M.Phil. Dissertation was on India's Economic Diplomacy and his Ph.D. Thesis on India's Public Diplomacy.

== As a Scholar of India's Foreign Policy ==
According to former Foreign Secretary of India Amb. Shyam Saran, Dr. Rejaul Karim Laskar has made "a major contribution to contemporary diplomatic history" of India through his book Forging New Partnerships, Breaching New Frontiers: India's Diplomacy during the UPA Rule 2004-14 (published by Oxford University Press, a Department of the University of Oxford). Laskar’s book was published after getting due approval from the ‘Delegates of the Press’ (a body headed by the Vice Chancellor of the University of Oxford) of the University of Oxford.

According to the former National Security Advisor of India Amb. Shivshankar Menon, Dr. Rejaul Karim Laskar's scholarly work constitutes "a seminal addition to works on Indian diplomacy".

Prof. Sumit Ganguly, Rabindranath Tagore Chair in Indian Cultures and Civilizations, Indiana University-Bloomington— one of the leading authorities on India’s foreign policy— describes Laskar’s book as "most impressive, thoughtful and insightful volume".

The Executive Director of the United States Advisory Commission on Public Diplomacy Dr. Vivian S. Walker has prescribed Laskar’s book as a "required reading for policymakers, researchers, and practitioners interested in the emergence of India as a rising power".

== Activities as a Congress Ideologue ==
As an ideologue of the Congress party, Laskar has written extensively on the foreign policy of the Congress party led UPA Government. He asserts that "the ultimate objective" of the foreign policy of the UPA Government has been "to shape India’s external environment" in a way that enhances India’s security and brings about its "rapid, sustainable and inclusive" economic growth. He claims that by means of an "enlightened" foreign policy, carried out through "dynamic and effective" diplomacy, the UPA Government has “successfully promoted” India’s interests on a “broad range of issues, including trade, development, economic recovery, climate change, energy security and counter terrorism”.

Laskar argues that the UPA government has successfully removed the "imbalance" which was allegedly brought in by the previous NDA government in India’s foreign policy. He observes that while the foreign policy of the UPA government has been "firmly committed" to India’s "core national values", the government has, at the same time, pursued a strategy of "dynamic adaptation" to changes in India's external environment.

Laskar is a strong supporter of the Indo-US nuclear agreement concluded by the UPA Government led by Dr. Manmohan Singh and the G. W. Bush administration and claims that the agreement is the first step for India to become a part of the management of the global nuclear order in particular and that of the new world order in general. He terms this agreement as a "diplomatic masterstroke" of the UPA Government, which has put India on the "path of becoming a privileged member" of the global nuclear order from that of being a "victim of discrimination" by the same regime. In fact, he claims that "nuclear diplomacy" of the UPA government has been the "most brilliant component" of UPA government's diplomacy. He argues that UPA Government's "nuclear diplomacy" has ensured that India gets international recognition as a "responsible state with advanced nuclear technology" in addition to bringing to an end the "three decades of technology denial to India".

Laskar also claims that the UPA government has made "great strides" in India's Look East policy and at the same time ensured that this policy "contributes substantially" to India's national interest-both economic and security.

As regards neighborhood policy, Laskar argues that the UPA Government's diplomacy strived for a "stable, prosperous, democratic and peaceful neighborhood" by means of "sustained political engagement, economic partnership, enhanced connectivity, developmental assistance and people-to-people contacts".

On economic diplomacy of the UPA Government, Laskar argues that the factors which helped India to be largely unharmed by the 2008 financial crisis include not only the good management of the domestic economy by the government but also the success of the UPA government's diplomacy in "maintaining an external environment" conducive to India’s "sustained economic growth”.

Laskar has also written on foreign policies of previous Congress governments of India. On the foreign policy of India’s first Prime Minister Jawaharlal Nehru, Laskar argues that the adoption of the policy of Non-alignment and its "deft implementation" by Nehru has "secured" for India "a leadership role in world affairs" although India was neither major economic power nor a major military power at that time. On Prime Minister Rajiv Gandhi’s foreign policy, Laskar maintains that former’s neighbourhood policy was based on the belief that "the pre-eminent position" of India in South Asia gives it "unique and special responsibilities" for the maintenance of peace and stability in the region.

Apart from foreign policy, he has also written on other policy initiatives of the UPA Government such as the MGNREGA, Direct Benefit Transfer as well as its other economic and social policies.

== As AICC Minority Observer for Meghalaya, Nagaland, and Mizoram ==
In October 2016, Laskar was entrusted by the Minority Department of All India Congress Committee to develop a strategy for attracting religious minorities (Christians, Muslims, Buddhists, etc.) belonging to the North East region of India towards the Congress party. In April 2017, he submitted his 148-page report containing detailed recommendations to the AICC.

In May 2017, Laskar was appointed as All India Congress Committee (AICC) Minority Department's Observer for the three states Meghalaya, Nagaland and Mizoram. On 15 October 2017, Laskar submitted his "interim report" to the AICC. He will submit his final report to the AICC in January 2018 for Meghalaya and Nagaland and in October 2018 for Mizoram.

Earlier in February 2017, Laskar was appointed as the Observer of AICC Minority Department for Manipur Legislative Assembly elections to coordinate the election campaign in the 60 Assembly constituencies of the Indian state of Manipur. On 9 April 2017, he submitted his report on the Manipur elections to the AICC.

Recently, Laskar has been very vocal about alleged harassment of religious minorities, especially Christians, in India and alleged attacks on Churches. He has also been vocal about what he terms as "discrimination meted out by the Modi Government against the minorities". He has also criticized the Presidential candidate of NDA Ram Nath Kovind over his alleged remark terming Islam and Christianity as alien. He is a critic of the Citizenship (Amendment) Bill 2016, which, he claims, can change the demography of sparsely populated states of Northeast India such as Meghalaya, Nagaland and Mizoram. He claims that the BJP is "dreaming" about coming to power in Meghalaya with the support of NPP. However, he claims that BJP-NPP alliance will not succeed in Meghalaya. He even claims that the BJP's increased profile in Meghalaya will actually indirectly benefit the Congress. Laskar is known for his good relations with the Church leaders of North East India. Recently, Laskar has been working in close cooperation with Meghalaya Chief Minister Mukul Sangma.

Laskar-Lotha "Debate"

In response to the allegations of corruption against him by the National Secretary of BJP Scheduled Tribe Morcha Hayithung Bill Lotha, Meghalaya Chief Minister Mukul Sangma threatened to take legal action against Lotha. In response, Lotha dared Mukul Sangma for a five hour long "open debate". Immediately, Laskar came to the defence of Chief Minister Mukul Sangma asking Lotha to debate with him for ten hours on the policies of BJP and the Congress on tribals and minorities instead of the Chief Minister Mukul Sangma. Laskar argued that the Chief Minister Mukul Sangma should not be distracted from his "work of development of the state". In response, Lotha said that he is ready for a two day long debate with Laskar on the condition that the Chief Minister Mukul Sangma also joins the debate on the third day. Laskar accepted Lotha's challenge of 48 hour long debate on the policies of BJP and the Congress on tribals and minorities but rejected the condition that the Chief Minister Mukul Sangma joins the debate arguing that Mukul Sangma is a "Man of Action".

== Resignation from Congress party ==
On July 14, 2023, Rejaul Karim Laskar, in a statement to the press, announced his resignation from the Congress party. He also announced that he is not joining any political party “at the moment” and will rather focus on teaching and scholarship on India's foreign policy.

== See also ==
- Laskar Committee Report
