= Romani Mexicans =

Romani Mexicans gitanos mexicanos
Total population
- 15,850

Regions with significant populations
- Mexico City, Veracruz, San Luis Potosí

Languages
- Mexican Spanish, Romani, Caló

Religion
- Christianity (Roman Catholicism, Evangelical Protestantism), Islam, Folk religion

Related ethnic groups
- other Romani diasporas

There is a Romani population in Mexico, most being the descendants of past migrants from Europe. According to data collected by the National Institute of Statistics and Geography in 2000, they numbered 15,850, however, the total number is likely larger. In Mexico, they are commonly known as gitanos or rom.

== History ==
The first Romani group in Mexico were the Spanish gitanos that arrived during the Colonial era.

Some of the mid-19th century migrants may have arrived to Mexico via Argentina.

In the late 19th and early 20th century migrants from Hungary, Poland and Russia began arriving. In 1931, after a substantial colony of these latter roma had settled, and following complaints of delinquency, the law was changed to prohibit further settlement in Mexico.

== Culture ==
In the mid 1900s, Romani caravans were known for showing movies in rural towns (cine ambulante, traveling cinema).

Today, their economic activities mainly revolve around the sale of textiles, cars, trucks and jewelry and also the teaching of singing and dancing. As a result of adoption of Evangelical Protestantism, there has been an almost complete abandonment of fortune-telling as a profession among the Romani of Mexico City.

== Notable individuals ==
- Alfonso Mejia-Arias - musician, writer and politician

== See also ==
- La Lagunilla Market - popular with Romani merchants
