= Punjabi Mexican Americans =

Americans descended from Punjabis who initially immigrated to Mexico

mexicano-estadounidenses punjabíes (Spanish)
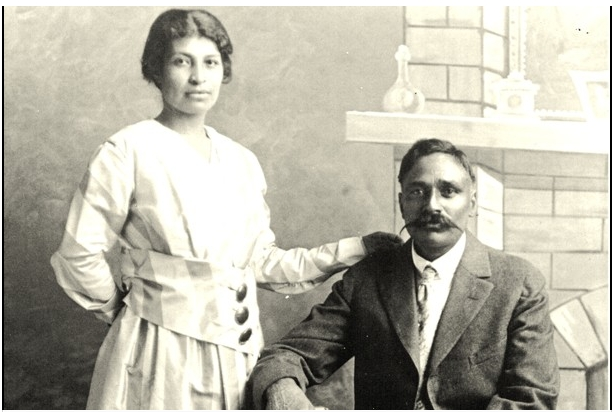
- A Punjabi Mexican American couple

Regions with significant populations
- California

Languages
- English; Punjabi; Spanish

Religion
- Sikhism, Hinduism, Islam, Christianity, Unaffiliated

Related ethnic groups
- Punjabi Americans, Mexican Americans, Indian Americans, Pakistani Americans, Indian Mexicans

Punjabi Mexican Americans or Punjabi Chicanos, originally Punjabi Mexicans, are a distinctive ethnicity holding its roots in a migration pattern that occurred since the British Raj. The first conglomeration of these cultures occurred in the Imperial and Central Valleys in 1907, near the largest irrigation system in the Western Hemisphere. The majority of them localized to Yuba City, California.

== History ==
For decades in the British Raj colonial era (early 20th century), Punjabi farming families sent their sons out of Punjab to earn money. Intending to return to the Punjab Province, only a handful of men brought their wives and families. In the United States, however, due to changed immigration laws it was not possible for the families of Punjabi workers to join them. Beyond this, poor wages and working conditions convinced the Punjabi workers to pool their resources, lease land and grow their own crops, thereby establishing themselves in the newly budding farming economy of northern California.

== Intermarriage ==
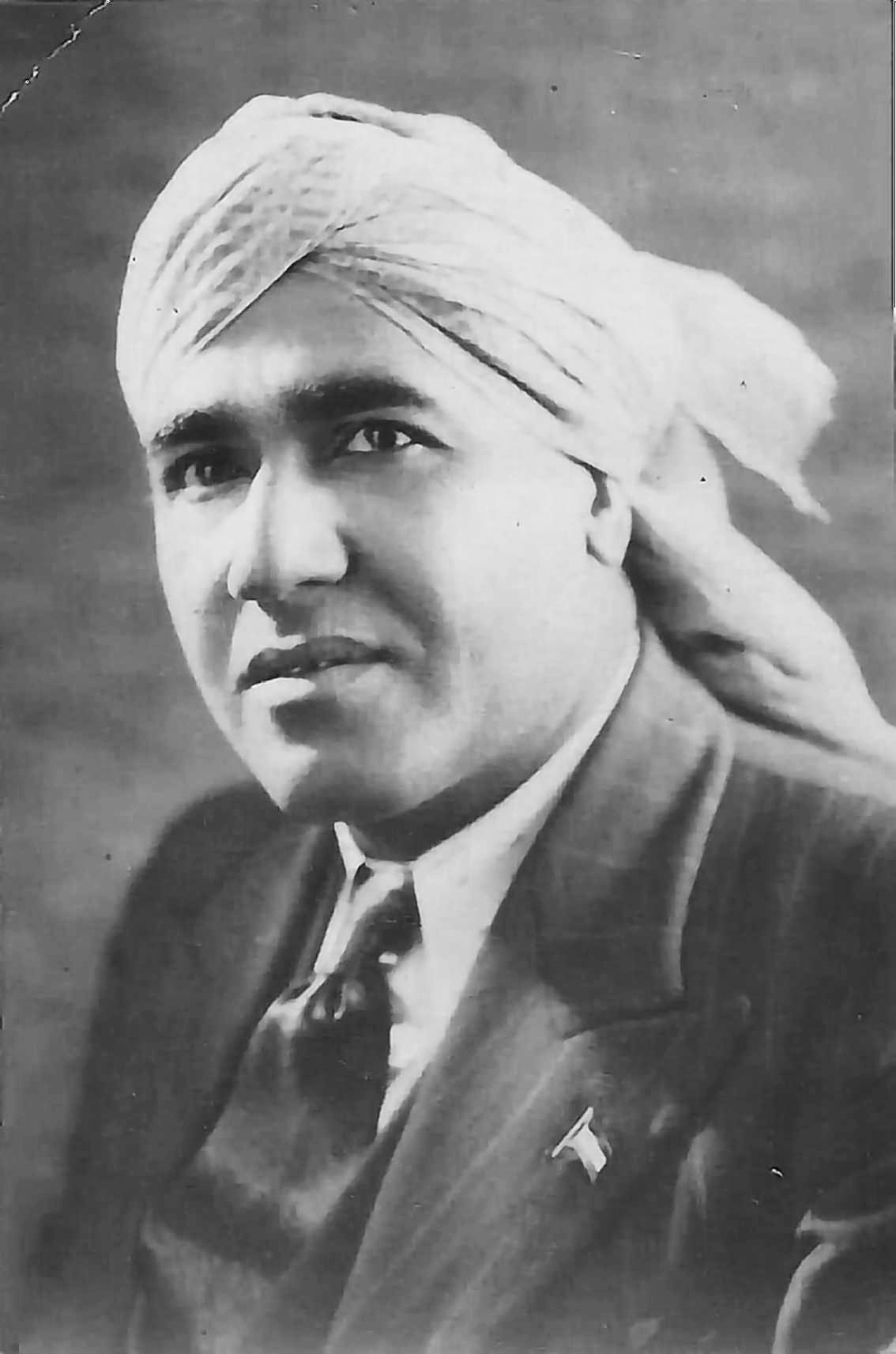
Indian freedom fighter Udham Singh married a Mexican woman during the 1920s while he was in California, with whom he had two children

The main reasons the Punjabi men are thought to have chosen women of Mexican ancestry are due to sharing phenotypical and sociocultural similarities. Mexican women were considered brown, as were the Punjabi men; interracial marriage bans in California prevented Punjabis from marrying Black or White women but allowed them to marry Mexican women, who—much like the women of Punjab—covered their heads and bodies to protect themselves from the sun while working in the fields. Traditionally Mexicans and Punjabis shared a rural way of life, with similar types of food and family values, and thus maintained a similar material and social culture. Mexicans and Indians shared an initially lower class status in American society.

Punjabi men married Mexican women laborers and there were eventually almost four hundred of these biethnic couples clustered in California’s agricultural valleys. Although the majority of these intermarriages happened in northern-central California in the Central Valley, in areas such as Yuba City, Stockton, or Sacramento, Punjabi-Mexican marriages occurred as far away as New Mexico; Nevada; Utah; Arizona; or El Paso, Texas. Husbands and wives spoke to each other in rudimentary English or Spanish. Men tended to be older (i.e. in their late thirties or forties), and women tended to be younger (i.e. in their early twenties). Punjabi men learned Spanish to communicate with Mexican agricultural laborers and to speak to their wives. Some Punjabi men adopted Spanish names or nicknames: e.g., Miguel for Maghar, Andrés for Inder, and Mondo for Mohammed.

== Cuisine ==
The culinary traditions of Punjabi Mexican Americans draws from both Mexican and Punjabi cuisines. Punjabi men taught their wives how to cook chicken curry, roti, and various vegetable curries. In Yuba City, a Punjabi Mexican American family ran the El Ranchero restaurant—the only Mexican restaurant in California (before closing in 1993) that featured chicken curry and roti.

== Culture ==
An important retention of Punjabi culture was the disposition of the body upon death. The Hindus and Sikhs insisted upon cremation, then uncommon in North America, and Muslims carried out orthodox burial ceremonies for each other (though the plots in which they are buried in rural California have since been misnamed "Hindu plots"). The wives were buried in the Mexican Catholic section of local cemeteries, as were the children.

== Notable people ==
- Mike Mohamed (born 1988) – American football linebacker (partial descent)

== See also ==
- Asian Latin Americans
- Indian immigration to Mexico
