= Cuba–India relations =

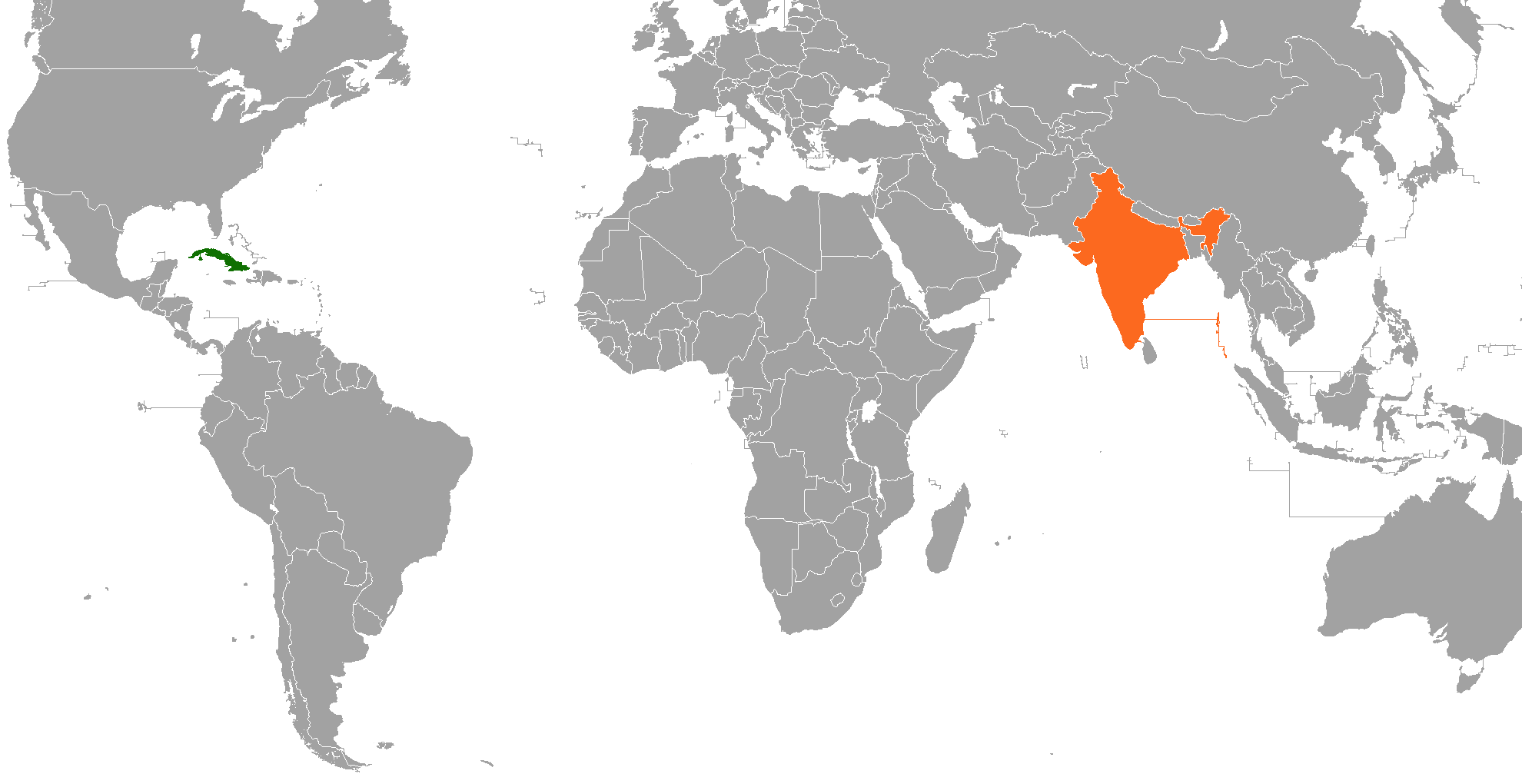

- Cuba: India

Diplomatic mission
- Embassy of India in Havana: Embassy of Cuba in New Delhi

Envoy
- Ambassador T. Armstrong Changsan: Ambassador Oscar Martinez Cordoves

Cuba–India relations are the bilateral ties between the Republic of Cuba and the Republic of India. The two countries share a warm and close relationship marked by mutual respect, solidarity and cooperation.

== History ==
India was among the first nations to recognize Cuba following the 1959 Cuban revolution. Following the revolution, Fidel Castro sent Ernesto "Che" Guevara to India on a two-week visit. Guevara arrived in New Delhi on 30 June 1959. He met with Indian Prime Minister Jawaharlal Nehru the next day. Nehru presented Guevara with an ivory handled khukri in a walnut scabbard. Today, the khukri is preserved at the Centro de Estudios Che Guevara in Havana. In his report on the meeting, Guevara noted, "Nehru received us with an amiable familiarity of a patriarchal grandfather but with noble interest in the dedication and struggles of the Cuban people." The two delegations agreed to establish diplomatic missions and increase trade as soon as possible. Guevara and the Cuban delegation also met with Indian Defence Minister V. K. Krishna Menon, senior defence officers, members of the Planning Commission. He also visited the Cottage Industries Emporium, the Okhla Industrial Area, the Agricultural Research Institute and the National Physical Laboratory. Guevara also met with the Chilean ambassador in New Delhi and was interviewed by journalist K.P. Bhanumathy for All India Radio. Guevara also visited Kolkata before departing India. Despite his preference for violent struggle, Guevara expressed appreciation for Mahatma Gandhi. Upon his return to Cuba, Guevara wrote, "In India, the word war is so distant from the spirit of the people that they did not use it even in the tensest moments of their struggle for independence. The great demonstrations of collective peaceful discontent forced the English colonialism to leave forever the land that they devastated during one hundred and fifty years."

India opened its embassy in Havana in January 1960, just six months after Guevara's visit. This had particular significance as it symbolised Indian solidarity with the Cuban revolution. Cuba maintains an embassy in New Delhi.

There have been several high level visits between leaders of the two countries. Cuban President Fidel Castro visited India in 1973 and 1983. Indian Prime Ministers Rajiv Gandhi and Manmohan Singh visited Cuba in 1985 and 2006 respectively.

India has always voted in favour of UN General Assembly resolutions calling for an end to the United States embargo against Cuba. Cuba has publicly expressed support for India's candidature for a permanent seat in the UN Security Council on numerous occasions. Both nations are also members of the Non-Aligned Movement. Fidel Castro stated, "The maturity of India ... , its unconditional adherence to the principles which lay at the foundation of the Non-Aligned Movement give us the assurances that under the wise leadership of Indira Gandhi [then Prime Minister of India], the non-aligned countries will continue advancing in their inalienable role as a bastion for peace, national independence and development."

== Economic relations ==
Bilateral trade between Cuba and India was around US$300 million in the 1980s. However, following the dissolution of the Soviet Union in 1991 and economic liberalisation in India in the 1990s, bilateral trade between the countries witnessed a sharp decline. Bilateral trade totaled $38.89 million in 2014–15. India's exports to Cuba stood at $37.32 million, while imports amounted to $1.57 million. The main commodities exported from India to Cuba are pharmaceutical products, organic chemicals, plastic and rubber articles, machinery and mechanical appliances. The main commodities Cuba exports to India are tobacco products including cigars, raw hides and skins, and leather. In March 2022, the IETO initiated India-Cuba Trade and Pharma Relationships in Telangana.

== Indian foreign aid ==
India donated a 5 KW solar power plant to Cuba in 1995, and also provided ₹5 lakh (equivalent to ₹33 lakh or US$34,000 in 2026) worth of spare parts to the country. In 2008, India wrote off a $62 million loan and interest that it had provided to the Cuban government. India provided Cuba with $2 million in cash in the aftermath of Hurricanes Gustav, Ike and Paloma in August–September 2008. India began a three-year training program, which completed in July 2010, for Cuban citizens at the India Cuba Knowledge Centre. The centre, operated by NIIT, provided training to over 1900 Cubans in several fields.

India also provided donations worth two million dollars during the Cuban earthquake.

In November 2013, India donated $1 million for the construction of an astro turf hockey pitch in Cuba.

Citizens of Cuba are eligible for scholarships under the Indian Technical and Economic Cooperation Programme and the Indian Council for Cultural Relations. Between 1989 and 2016, 671 Cubans have received training in several fields in India.

=== "Bread of India" ===
India provided Cuba with 10,000 tonnes of wheat and 10,000 tonnes of rice in 1992 when Cuba was undergoing hardship. Fidel Castro termed the donation as the "Bread of India", because it was sufficient to provide one loaf of bread to each Cuban citizen.

== Cultural relations ==
Yoga is a part of the Cuban government's health curriculum. The birth anniversary of Rabindranath Tagore is commemorated in Cuba annually. On 7 May 2007, a bust of Tagore, donated by the ICCR, was unveiled at Havana. The library at the Casa de Asia in Havana is named after Tagore. Busts of Mahatma Gandhi and Mother Teresa are also present in Havana.

India was declared the "Guest of Honour Country" at the Havana International Book Fair in February 2015, becoming the first Asian country to be conferred the honour.

=== Sports ===
Cuba and India signed an agreement on co-operation in sports during the visit of then Indian Minister for Sports Mani Shankar Aiyer in 2007. Subsequently, the Indian Amateur Boxing Federation and the Army Sports Institute, Pune have hired several coaches from Cuba. In 2013, India sent 32 Indian coaches to receive training in Cuba.

== Indians in Cuba ==
The Indian community in Cuba dates back to the early 20th century when Indian plantation workers who were indentured laborers from Jamaica and other parts of the Caribbean came to Cuba to work on sugarcane plantations. As of February 2016, an estimated 200 Cuban citizens are of Indian descent. The majority of them reside in Guantanamo province, and most have been completely assimilated into the local culture, although some still have Indian names.

A small community of Indian citizens is present in Cuba, including Christian nuns, medical students and persons of Indian origin married to Cuban citizens. The community primarily resides in Havana. There are also a few businessmen of Indian origin.

== Resident diplomatic missions ==
- Cuba has an embassy in New Delhi.
- India has an embassy in Havana.

== See also ==
- Foreign relations of Cuba
- Foreign relations of India
- Indo-Caribbean
