= Indians in Venezuela =

- (India) (Venezuela)
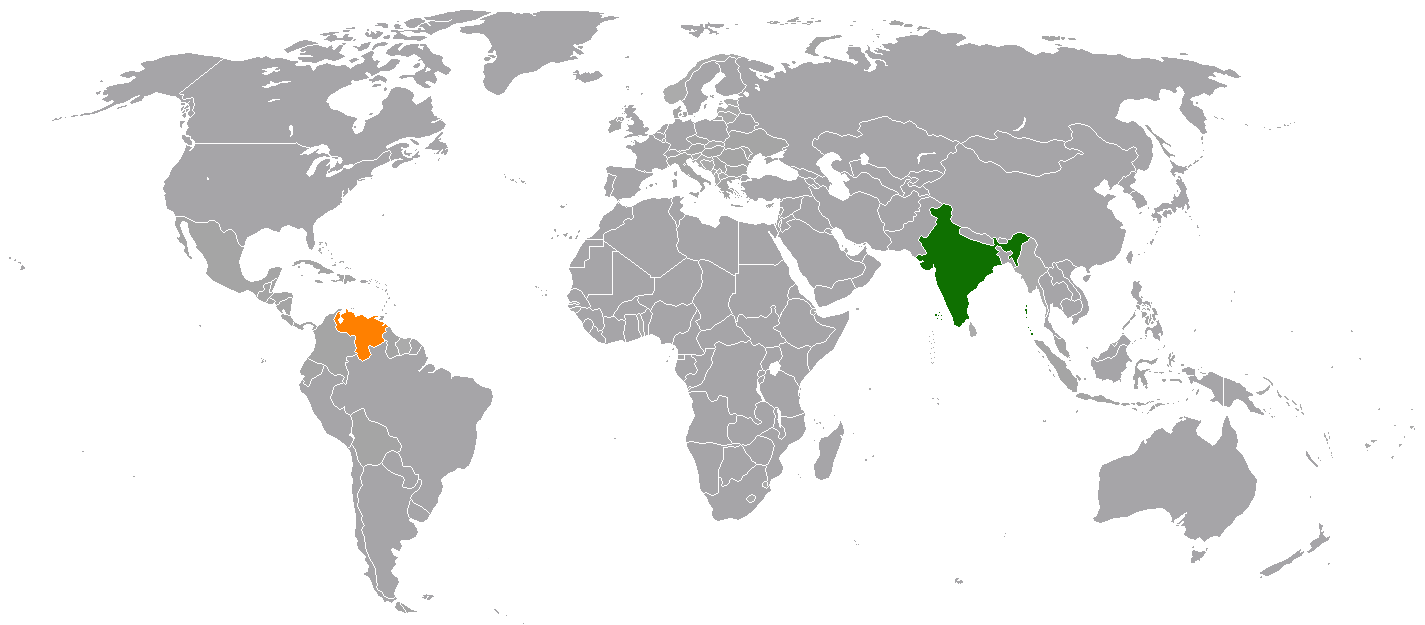

Total population
- 690

Regions with significant populations
- Caracas, Valencia, Ciudad Guayana

Languages
- English · Venezuelan Spanish · Indian languages

Religion
- Hinduism · Catholicism · Islam · Sikhism · Religions of India

Related ethnic groups
- Indo-Caribbean people

Indians in Venezuela form one of the smaller populations of the Indian diaspora. According to the Indian Ministry of External Affairs (IMEA), among the approximately 690 East Indians living in Venezuela, 400 were Venezuelans of East Indian origin, 280 were Indian citizens and 10 were stateless residents. However, unofficial records put the Indo-Caribbean community from Guyana, Suriname, Jamaica and Trinidad and Tobago over 50,000.

== Migration History ==
During the oil-related high-income years of the 1970s, there were around 400 NRIs in Venezuela. The Indian community consisted of personnel from the petroleum and petrochemical sectors, as well as a large number of traders. Many of them had taken their families with them to Venezuela. Most of the traders belonged to the Sindhi community but there were also some persons from Tamil Nadu, Gujarat and Punjab.

When the oil boom ended in 1982, followed by devaluation of the local currency, many of the NRIs decided to seek their fortunes elsewhere. Currently, the diaspora has been whittled down to half its former size.

== See also ==
- India–Venezuela relations
- Asian Latin Americans
- Hinduism in Venezuela
- Indo-Caribbean people
