= Betasing =

Betasing Betasing
- Town
- Location in Meghalaya, India Betasing (India)
- Coordinates: 25.5096015°N 89.9517632°E
- Country: India
- State: Meghalaya
- Community Development Blocks in India: Betasing Block.

Languages
  - Official: English
  - Local: Garo, Hajong, Koch
- Time zone: UTC+5:30 (IST)
- PIN: 794115
- Vehicle registration: ML

Betasing is the Community & Rural Development Block headquarters situated 7 km from the district headquarters of South West Garo Hills, Ampati.

== Demographics ==
Betasing Block of South West Garo Hills has a total population of 72,103 as per the census of 2011. Out of which 36,340 are males and 35763 are females.

=== Religion ===
About 45,545 of the people follow Christianity while 20,181 follow Hinduism. Unaffiliated and other religions make up the rest of the population.

Religion in Betasing (2011)
1. Christianity (65.9%)
2. Hinduism (28.0%)
3. Others (6.07%)

=== Languages ===
About 92% of the population are Tribals. Hajong, Garo and Koch are the major tribes in the Community and Rural Development Block.

Languages of Betasing (2011)
1. Garo (67.9%)
2. Hajong (13.1%)
3. Koch (11.0%)
4. Bengali (5.97%)
5. Others (2.11%)
