= Hinduism in Mexico =

Mexican Hindus Hindúes Mexicanos
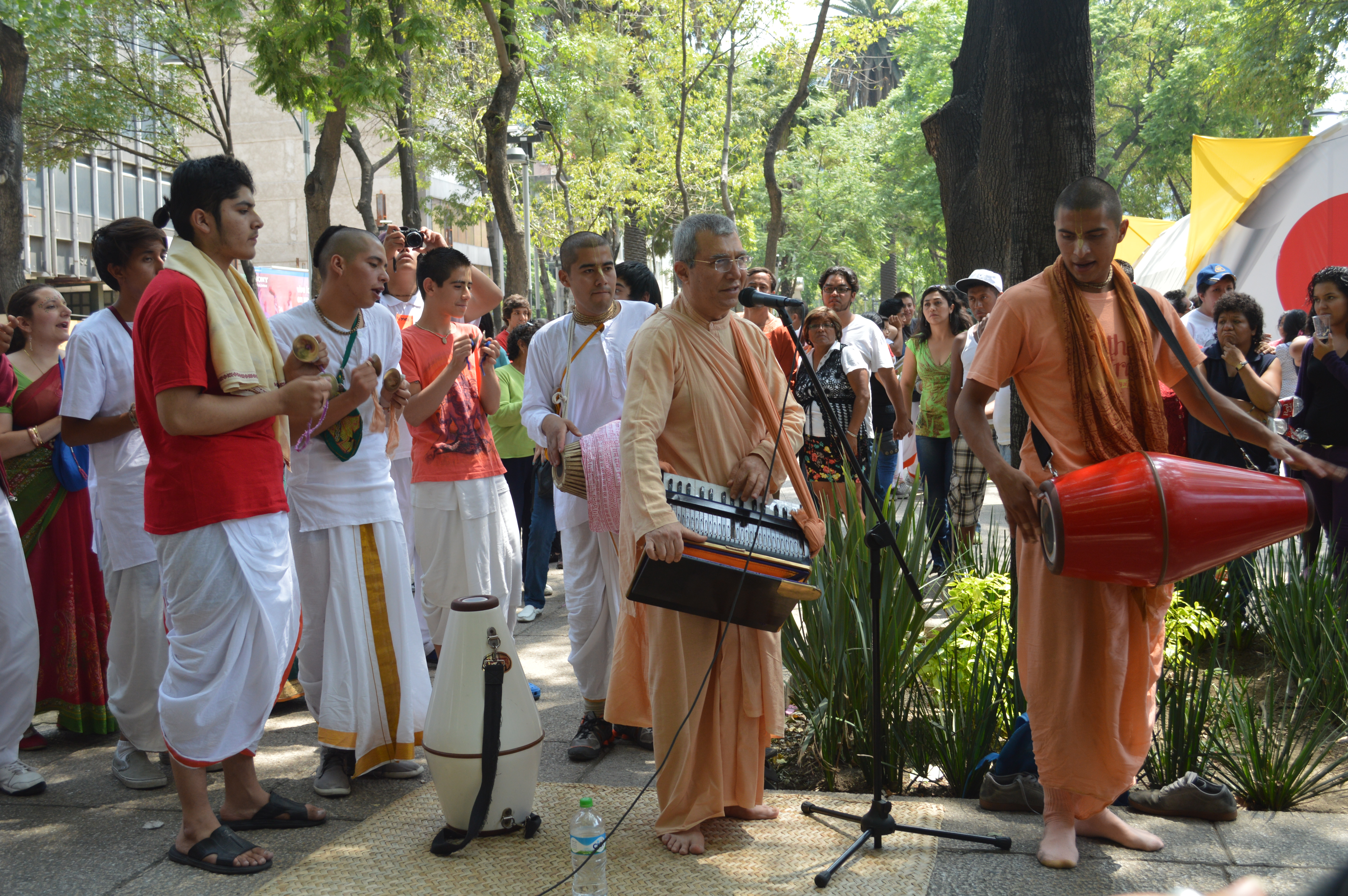

Total population
- ▲12,601 (2020) ▲0.01% of the Mexican Population

Regions with significant populations
- Mexico City, Guadalajara, Santiago de Queretaro, Tijuana and Mexicali.

Languages
- Sanskrit (Sacred); Mexican Spanish; English; Hindi and other Languages of India

Hinduism in Mexico is a minority religion. There were about 12,601 (0.01%) Hindus in Mexico as of 2020.

== Hindu Population & Demographics ==
Historical population
Year	Pop.	±%
2010	10,296	—
2020	12,601	+22.4%

Year	Percent	Increase in pop. %	Increase in %
2010	0.009%	-	-
2020	0.01%	+0.001%	0.1%

== Status of Hindus ==
The Hindus in the country are mainly businessmen or professionals. Many of them work with one or the other international organization or a multinational corporation.

== Temples ==
A Sai Baba temple and a Vaishnav temple have been constructed in Mexico City by the Sangam Organization. There are several center from some other worshipers as well.

The country got its first Ram Temple constructed in the city of Queretaro with the idols brought from India.

== Vaishnavas ==
ISKCON has 10 centres in Mexico.

- Centre 1- Guadalajara, Pedro Moreno No. 1791, Sector Juarez, Jalisco.
- Centre 2- Mexico City, Tiburcio Montiel 45, Colonia San Miguel Chapultepec, D.F, 11850.
- Centre 3- Monterrey, Av. Luis Elizondo No. 400, local 12, Col. Alta Vista.
- Centre 4- Saltillo, Blvd. Saltillo No. 520, Col. Buenos Aires.
- Centre 5- Tulancingo, (mail:) Apartado 252, Hildago.
- Centre 7- Rural Community at Veracruz.
- Centre 8- Additional Restaurant at Veracruz, Restaurante Radhe, Sur 5 No. 50, Orizaba, Ver.
- Centre 9- Radha Govinda Restaurant, Justo Sierra 343, Centro, León de los Aldama, Gto..
- Centre 10- Nueva Bahulabana, M7MW+2C, El Saucillo, Gto..

== Sai Organisation ==
There are now 29 Sai centers in Mexico.

There are two Sai Schools in Mexico, one in Chihuahua and other in Cuernavaca. There are about 100 children in each school.

== Hinduism in Tijuana ==
In Tijuana, Hinduism is practiced in a diverse and diffuse manner among the population. It is found among established Indo-Hindus as well as local believers who, through a process of spiritual seeking, identify themselves as followers of Hindu traditions.

A portion of the Indo-Hindu community in Tijuana practices their religion by crossing the border into the United States, particularly to San Diego, California, where they can access religious products imported from their home country and visit Hindu temples. Those without visas to cross the border conduct their practices at home, using small altars. This adaptation in their mobility contexts and within a minority community allows them to adjust rituals to their new environment, while also reshaping gender roles, customs, and their connections with their countries of origin and residence. This situation contrasts with other religions in the region, as Hinduism in Tijuana is not predominantly practiced in congregational settings.

== See also ==
- Hinduism in South America
- Hinduism by country
- Encyclopedia of Hinduism
- Hindu eschatology
