= Barrio Chino (Mexico City) =

- Neighborhood of Mexico City
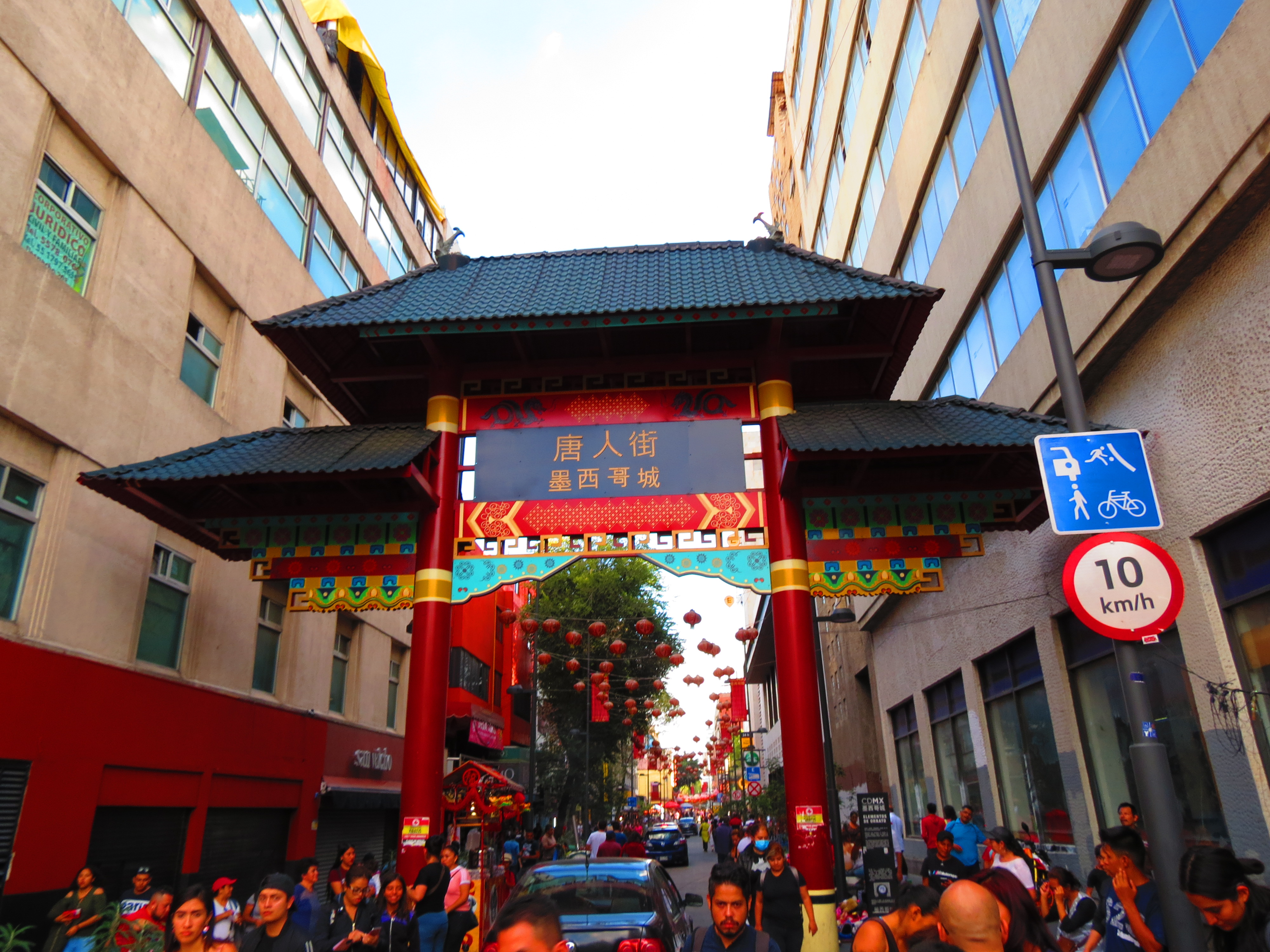
- Main entrance into the Barrio Chino
- Location in Mexico City
- Coordinates: 19.4320°N 99.1427°W
- Country: Mexico
- City: Mexico City
- Borough: Cuauhtémoc

Barrio Chino (Chinese: 墨西哥城唐人街; Cantonese Yale: Mahksāigō Sìhng Tòhngyàhngāai; Pinyin: Mòxīgē Chéng Tángrénjiē) is a barrio located in the downtown area of Mexico City, near the Alameda Central and Palacio de Bellas Artes. Barrio Chino exists primarily on two blocks along Dolores Street and one block east and west of the street. There was an expulsion of the ethnic Chinese in the 1930s and since then the ethnic Chinese have mixed and dispersed with the local population. According to the government of Mexico City, about 3,000 families in the city have Chinese heritage. In many parts of the older sections of the city, there are "cafes de chinos" (Chinese cafes), which are eateries that serve Chinese and Mexican food. The buildings in Barrio Chino are no different from the rest of the city, but businesses here are either restaurants or importers. Most of the shops and restaurants here had abundant Chinese-style decorations and altars, but statues of the Virgin of Guadalupe and San Judas Tadeo (a popular saint in Mexico) can be seen as well.

== History ==
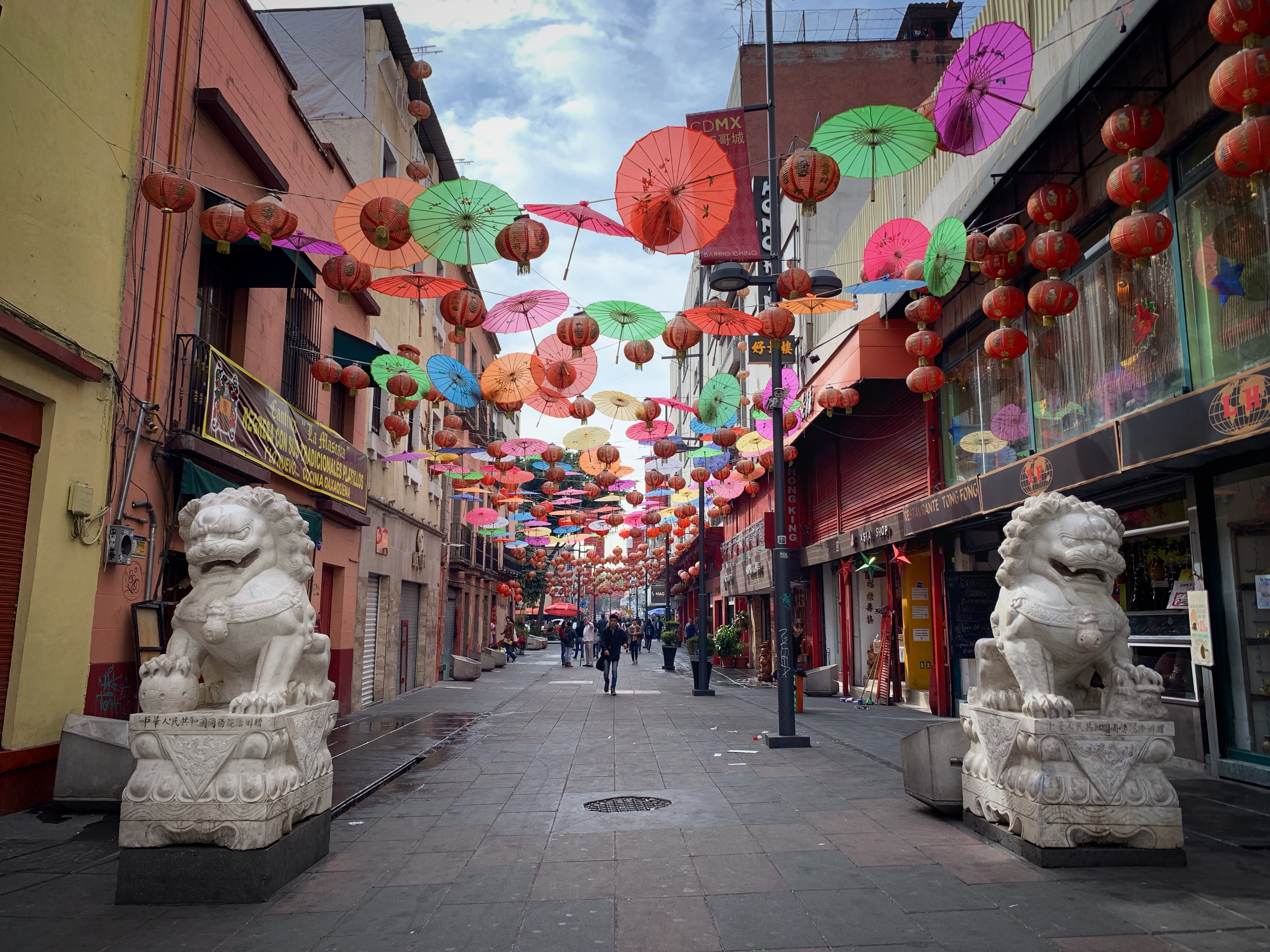
Shops on Dolores Street

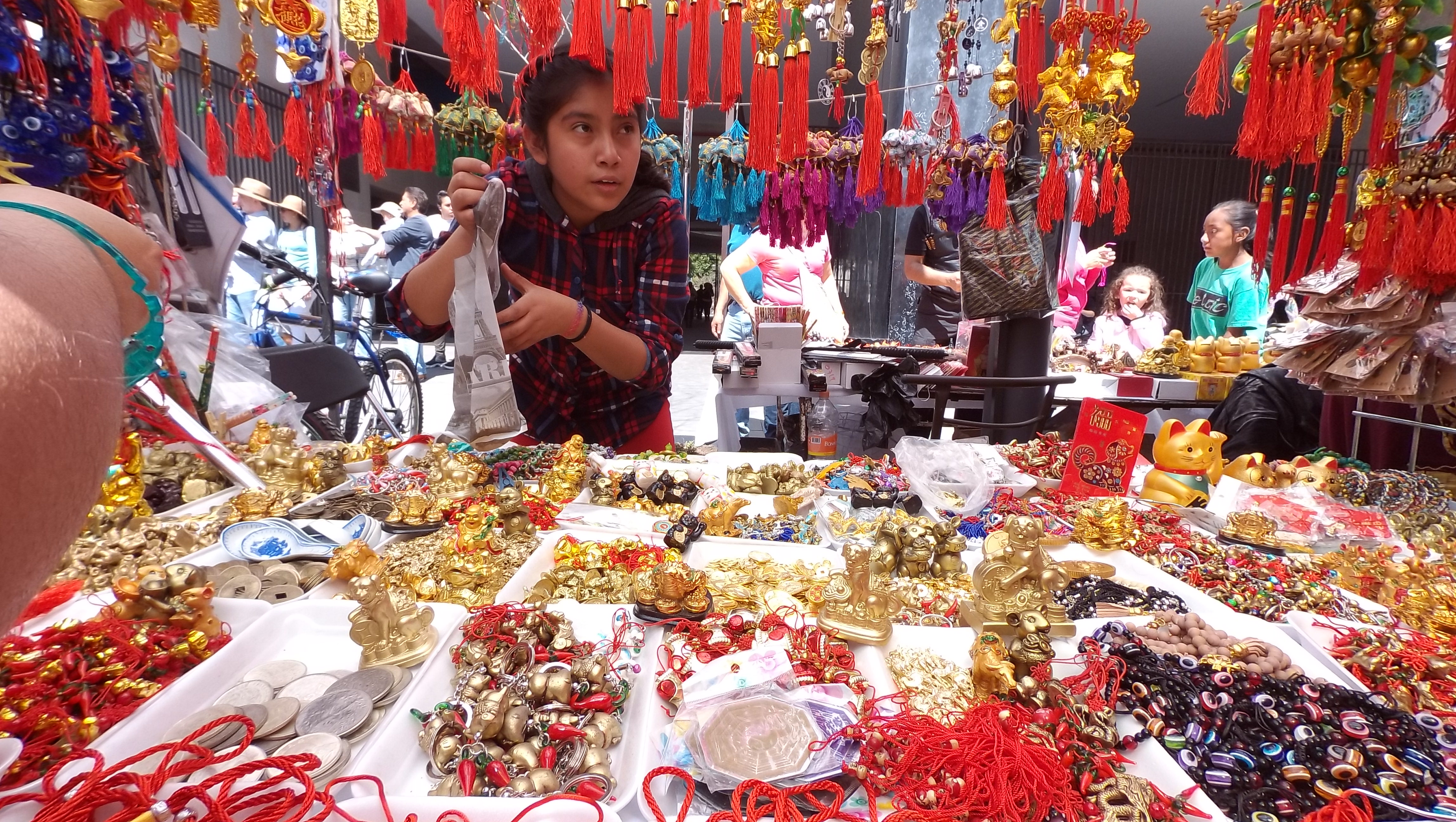
Stall selling charms for year of the dog celebrations

The history of Barrio Chino is tied to the history of Chinese immigration to Mexico and Mexico City spans the decades between the 1880s and the 1940s-1950s. Between the years 1880 and 1910, during the term of President Porfirio Diaz, the Mexican government was trying to modernize the country, especially in building railroads and developing the sparsely populated northern states. When the government could not attract enough Western European immigrants, it was decided to allow Chinese workers into the country. At first, small Chinese communities appeared mostly in the north of the country, but by the early 20th century, Chinese communities could be found in many parts of the country, including Mexico City.

A census done at the very end of the 19th century shows only 40 people registered as Chinese in Mexico City, but by 1910, that number had grown to 1,482. With the beginning of the Mexican Revolution, many Chinese in the northern states headed south to the city, both to escape the fighting and to escape nativist sentiment which had been particularly aimed at the Chinese. This culminated in 1911, with 303 Chinese slaughtered in the Torreón massacre. The Chinese in Mexico City congregated on Dolores Street one block south of the Alameda Central and the Palacio de Bellas Artes, in the historic center of Mexico City. They were basically businesspeople, opening restaurants, laundries, bakeries and lard shops. While initially, this population was confined to this particular neighborhood between 1910 and 1930, Chinese-owned businesses appeared in a number of other parts of the city, especially in the historic downtown. The number of Chinese-Mexicans in the city reached its peak during the 1920s and 1930s. when the Mexican government attempted to expel all ethnic Chinese (Mexican-born or not) from the country, managing to deport more than 70% between 1930 and 1940.

== Features ==
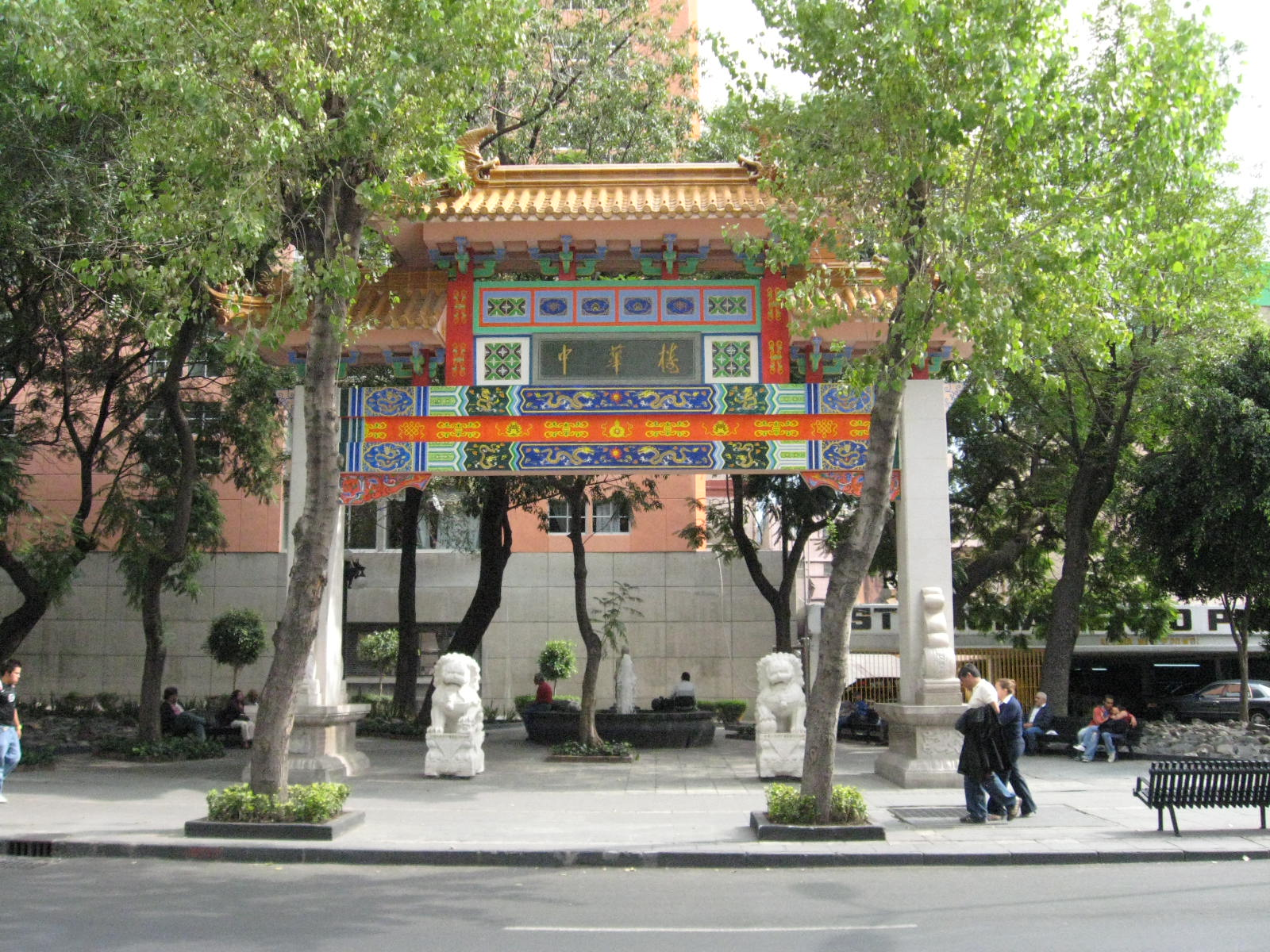
Paifang located in the Santos Degollado Park

Comunidad China de México, A. C. sponsors festivals and cultural events to preserve and promote Chinese-Mexican culture in the neighborhood. By far the largest festival sponsored is the annual Chinese New Year's celebration, which has as cosponsors organizations such as the borough of Cuauhtemoc and Coca-Cola. It is generally held on the weekend closest to the actual date of new year's and crowds squeeze into the two-block stretch of Dolores Street to see Lion dances, fireworks and other traditional new year's traditions and eat traditional foods such as steamed buns and roast suckling pig.

For the 2009 New Year's festival, celebrated on 30 January of that year, there were various festivals and events planned both inside and outside of the neighborhood. In addition to the traditional celebrations, the Mexico City government and the Chinese embassy held a number of events. The Chinese Embassy in Mexico had a gathering of its citizens who reside in the country to demonstrate Chinese cuisine and products at the Monument to the Revolution. Later there was a parade from the Angel of Independence to the Monument to the Revolution along Paseo de la Reforma. The Teatro del Pueblo had a Gala Night with Chinese opera, displays of martial arts and a parade of people wearing traditional Chinese dress.

The Chinese Arch was unveiled on 16 February 2008 as part of an effort to convert the small neighborhood into a tourist attraction. The arch was inaugurated by Mexico City mayor Marcelo Ebrard and Chinese ambassador Yen Hengmin to pay tribute to Chinese immigration into the city as well as to improve relations between the city and the country of China. The arch is located at the Santos Degollado Plaza, one block west of Dolores Street. The arch is made of steel-reinforced concrete, covered ceramic, granite and marble, and is decorated with two large statues of lions on each side.

== See also ==
- Viaducto Piedad
- Chinatowns in Latin America
