= Chinese immigration to Mexico =

Chinese Mexicans
sinomexicanos; mexicanos chinos 華裔墨西哥人
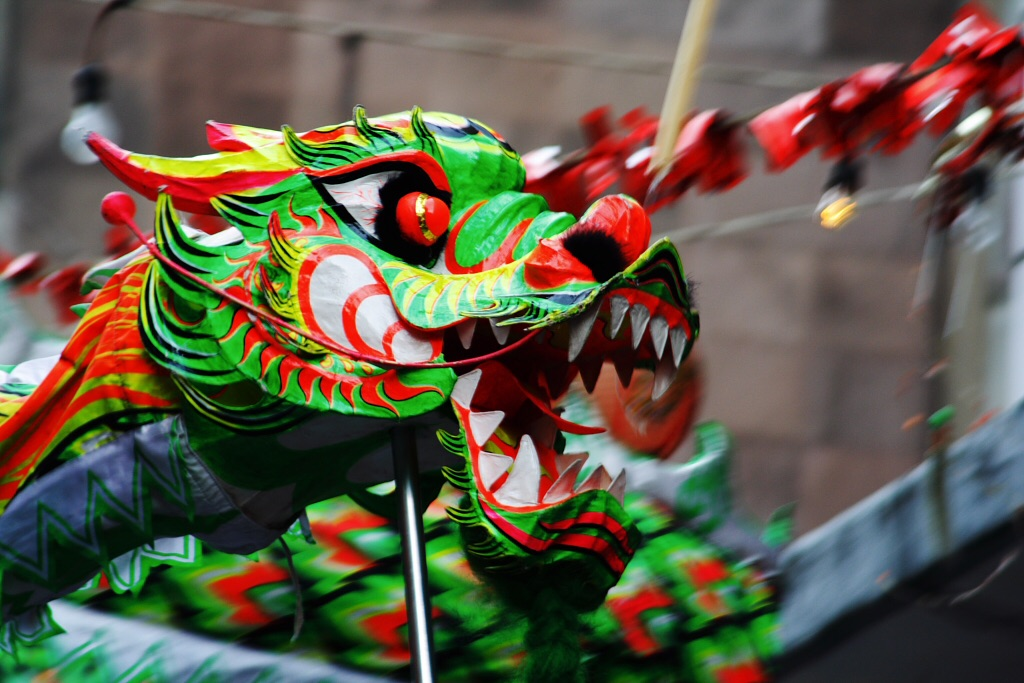
- Dragon dance at the 2008 Spring Festival celebrations in the Barrio Chino of Mexico City

Total population
- 24,499 Chinese nationals in Mexico (2020); 965 nationals of Taiwan in Mexico (2020) est. 70,000 Mexicans of Chinese descent (2008)

Regions with significant populations
- Baja California • Mexico City • Nuevo Leon • Sinaloa

Languages
- Mexican Spanish • Cantonese • Mandarin

Related ethnic groups
- Overseas Chinese • Asian Mexicans • Asian Latin Americans

Chinese immigration to Mexico began during the colonial era and has continued to the present day. The largest number of migrants to Mexico have arrived during two waves: the first spanning from the 1880s to the 1940s and another, reinvigorated wave of migrants arriving since the early 21st century. Between 1880 and 1910, during the term of President Porfirio Díaz, the Mexican government was trying to modernize the country, especially in building railroads and developing the sparsely populated northern states. When the government could not attract enough European immigrants, it was decided to allow Chinese migrant workers into the country. At first, small Chinese communities appeared mostly in the north of the country, but by the early 20th century, Chinese communities could be found in many parts of the country, including the capital of Mexico City. By the 1920s, the number of Chinese in the country was about 26,000.

However, strong anti-Chinese sentiment, especially in Sonora and Sinaloa, led to deportations and illegal expulsions of Chinese-Mexican families in the 1930s with an official count of 618 Chinese-Mexicans by 1940. Soon after the first wave of expulsions, efforts began to repatriate Chinese-Mexican families, which resulted in two major returns and various small groups returning between the late 1930s and the 1980s. Today, there are two main Chinese communities in Mexico: one in Mexicali and another in Mexico City.

After decades of low numbers migrating, the number of Chinese migrants is once again growing rapidly. In the 2000 census 1,754 Chinese nationals were counted as living in the country, while in the 2010 census the number of permanent residents was up to 6,655, with a total (permanent and temporary) migrant population of about 11,000. In 2009, the Instituto Nacional de Migración granted 2,661 migratory requests from individuals from China, while in 2010 it was 3,620, meaning growth for one year of 36%. Of the 54,440 migrants granted permanent residency in 2013, 4,743 (8.71%) were Chinese, more than any other group except for Americans with 12,905 (23.7%).

== Immigration to Mexico ==
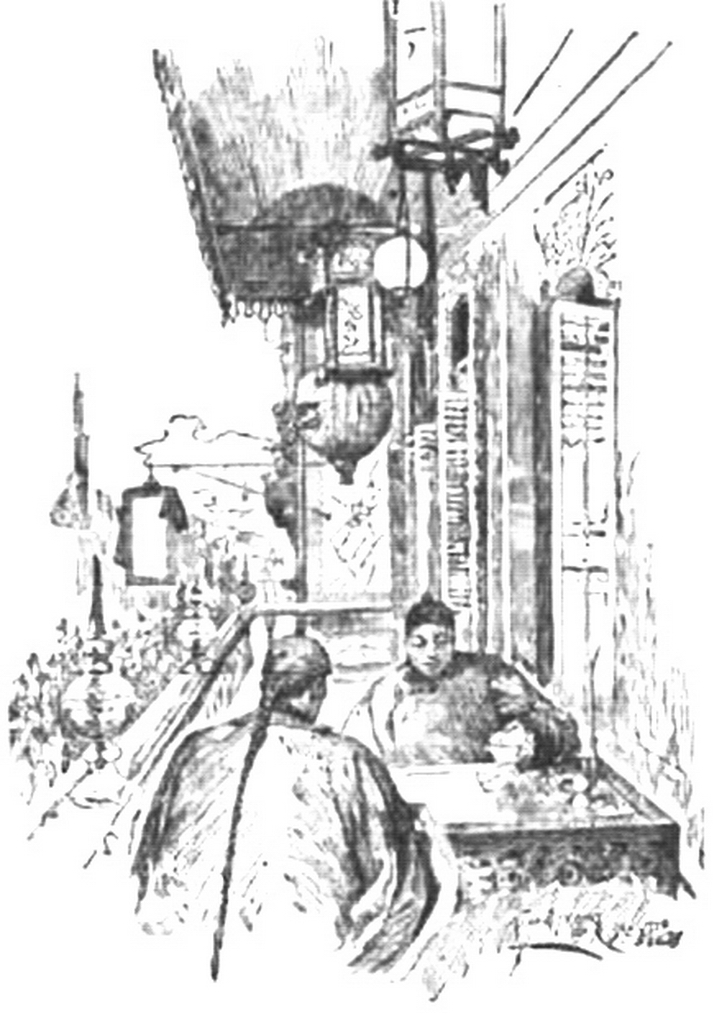
From book: Mexico, California and Arizona; being a new and revised edition of Old Mexico and her lost provinces. (1900) (image caption "A Balcony In The Chinese Quarter")

Mexico had its highest percentage of foreign immigrants in 1930. One reason for this is that from the 1820s to the 1920s, Mexico was mired in political instability and civil war. Another reason is that it did not have the vast areas of open land that attracted farmers to places like the United States and Argentina. Despite the small numbers, those immigrants who did come had a profound effect on their host country economically. European and U.S. investors came to dominate mining, oil and cash crop agriculture. European and Chinese immigrants took over banking and wholesale commerce as well as pioneering the industrialization of Mexico.

Many Americans came to settle Texas in the 19th century but this eventually led to its secession and then the Mexican–American War. This initiated the souring of many in Mexico to the idea of mass immigration.

Despite this, there was a concerted effort from 1876 to 1910 to encourage European immigration to "whiten" the population as well as bring capital into the country. The push here was to populate and develop the empty northern states as well as to promote European education and customs into rural areas dominated by indigenous people. It was thought that this would modernize the country and globalize its economy. However, the government could not entice enough Europeans to settle in the desert northern states due to the climate.

Most of the white Europeans and Americans who did arrive during the late 19th and early 20th century were associated with companies interested in railroads and mines. These companies brought in Chinese and other Asians, predominantly Chinese, became Mexico's fastest-growing immigrant group from the 1880s to the 1920s, exploding from about 1,500 in 1895 to 20,000 in 1910. Despite being the force behind the last major wave of immigration to Mexico, Porfirio Díaz himself became leery of foreign presence. He nationalized the foreign-built railroads and signed the first restrictive immigration legislation in the last years before the Mexican Revolution.

== Arrival ==
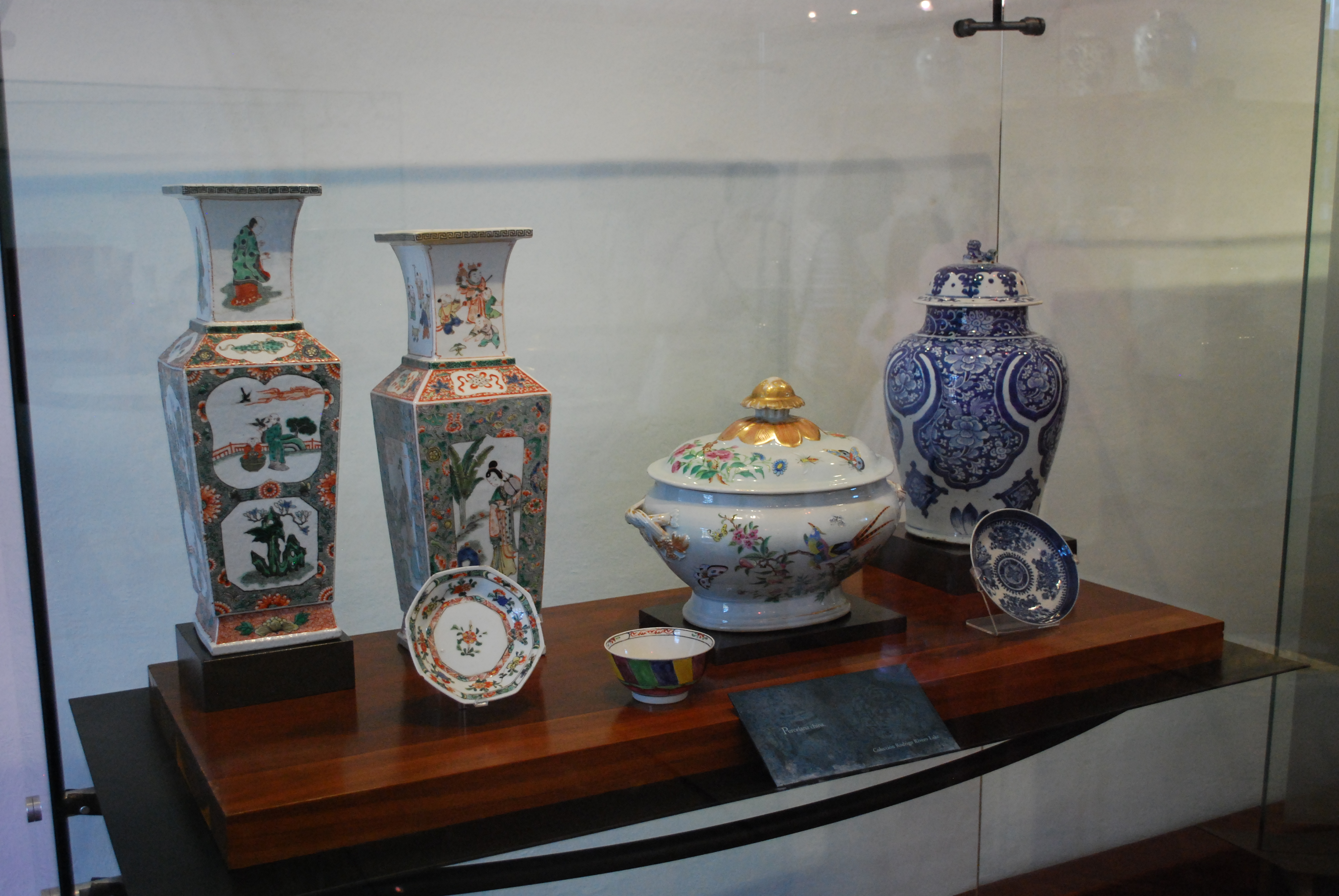
Chinese porcelain shipped on the Manila Galleons displayed at the San Diego Fort in Acapulco

The earliest known arrival of Chinese to Mexico was in 1635, when a group arrived to become servants and barbers in Mexico City. The Spanish barbers protested to the Governor that they could not compete and asked that the Chinese be expelled. Instead, while the Chinese barbers were not expelled, severe limitations were put on their numbers. Asian slaves who were shipped from the Spanish Philippines in the Manila-Acapulco galleons to Acapulco were all called "Chino" which meant Chinese, although in reality they were of diverse origins, including Japanese, Malays, Filipinos, Javanese, Timorese and people from Bengal, India, Ceylon, Makassar, Tidore, Ternate and Chinese. Filipinos, including native Filipinos, Chinese Mestizo Filipinos, and Chinese Filipinos, made up most of their population. The people in this community of diverse Asians in Mexico was called "los indios chinos" by the Spanish. Most of these slaves were male and were obtained from Portuguese slave traders who obtained them from Portuguese colonial possessions and outposts of the Estado da India, which included parts of India, Bengal, Malacca, Indonesia, Nagasaki in Japan and Macau. Some Spanish temporarily brought some of these Chino slaves from Mexico to Spain itself, where owning and showing off a Chino slave showed high class since Spanish aristocrats viewed their Chino slaves as fascinating trendy symbols of class. A Spanish woman named D. María de Quesada y Figueroa, in New Spain owned a China born Chinese man called Manuel who before being enslaved to her was taken from New Spain to be shown off in Seville until he was transferred to her ownership to be used by her as a slave by the woman's son Doctor D. Juan de Quesada in 1621. Records of three Japanese slaves dating from the 16th century, named Gaspar Fernandes, Miguel and Ventura who ended up in Mexico showed that they were purchased by Portuguese slave traders in Japan, brought to Manila from where they were shipped to Mexico by their owner Perez. Some of these Asian slaves were also brought to Lima in Peru, where there was a small community of Asians made out of Chinese, Japanese, Filipinos, Malays and others.

The earliest mass Chinese immigration to Mexico started in the 1870s, as efforts to entice Europeans to settle in the desert north failed. One of the main reasons for this was that many Europeans could not or would not tolerate the hot arid conditions. It was then thought to bring Chinese from areas of that country with similar climates. Matías Romero pushed to allow for this early Chinese immigration as the indigenous population was considered to be weak and lazy. He argued that the Chinese were industrious, submissive to authority and would work cheaply. The proposal was accepted but to only allow Chinese men into the country as guest workers. They were not supposed to build their own communities or mix with the Mexican population. All were supposed to return to China eventually. Resistance to the entrance of Chinese began even at this time because of the obvious difference in appearance plus news of the violence directed at the Chinese in California. One of the first ships to arrive from China had 500 Chinese immigrant workers aboard with a destination of the new railroad being built in Tehuantepec.

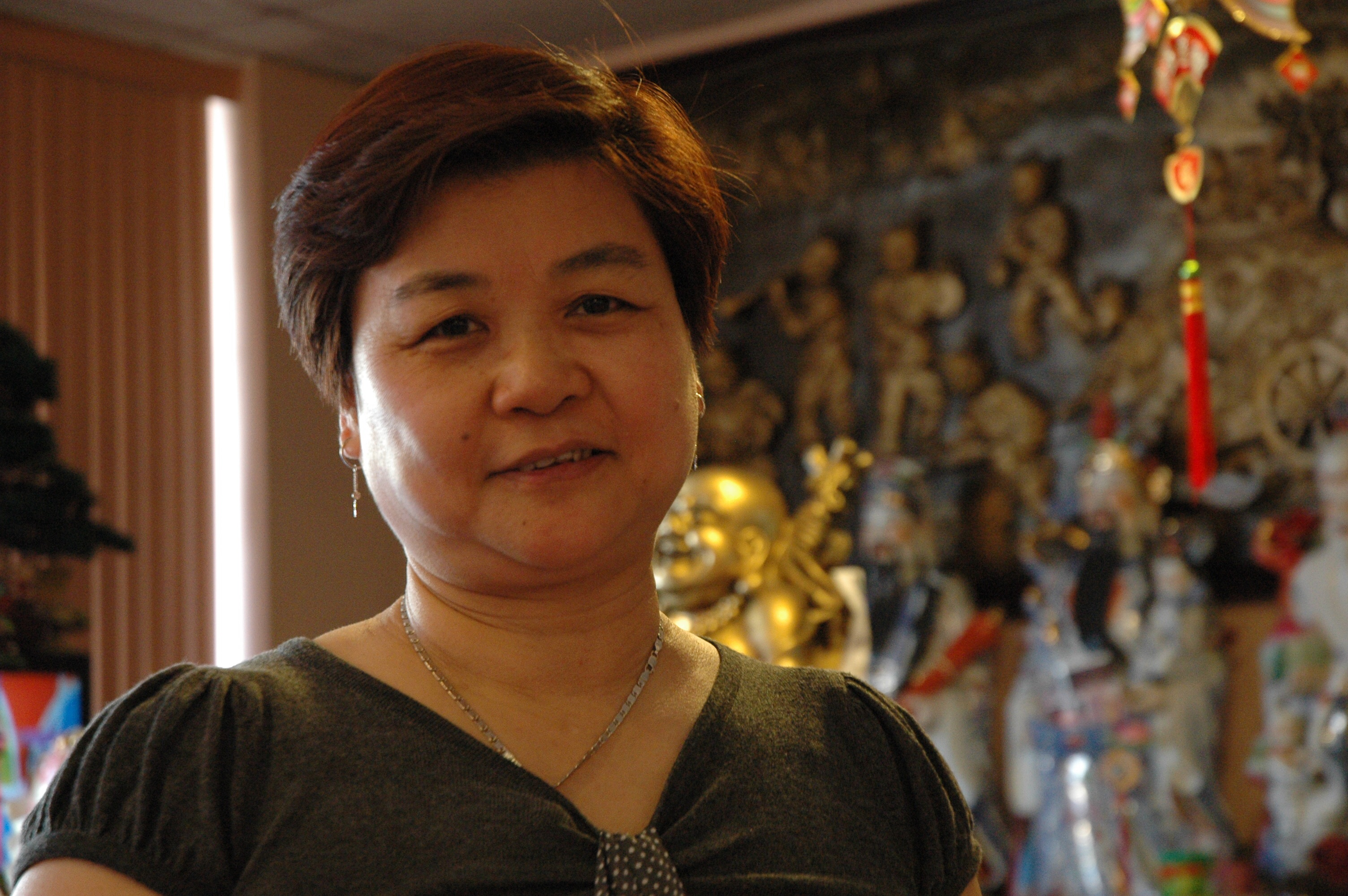
Chinese Mexican restaurant owner from Mexicali.

Chinese immigration was institutionalized in 1893 by the bilateral Treaty of Amity, Commerce and Navigation, which gave the Chinese immigrants to Mexico the same legal rights as Mexican nationals. Some Chinese had arrived earlier than this, establishing small colonies in Guaymas and Ensenada, but by 1895 there were still fewer than 1,000 Chinese nationals in the country. The major wave of Chinese immigration occurred between 1895 and 1910, with about seventy percent coming from the United States, which had been adopting anti-Chinese measures. However, several thousand Chinese were allowed to enter the country directly from China during the Cantu regime, more than 2,000 in 1919 alone. Many Chinese were also brought in from the U.S. and directly from China by U.S. companies to build railroads, work in mines and work cotton fields, despite protests by Mexican workers. This immigration caused Chinese communities to appear in a number of places in the country, including Manzanillo, Ciudad Juárez, Salina Cruz, Mazatlán, Tampico, Veracruz and Piedras Negras, concentrating in northern Mexico because of its proximity to the United States and the existence of opportunities in the developing economy.

Whether directly from China or from the United States, Chinese immigrants were overwhelmingly men (98%) and between the ages of 15 and 29 according to the Registro Nacional de Extranjeros (National Foreigner Registry). These laborers could be found in cotton fields, henequen plantations, mines and other labor-intensive areas from the desert north to the Yucatán.

These immigrants soon went from laborers to merchants, starting their own small enterprises. By the time of the Mexican Revolution, a number of Chinese merchants had considerable control of segments of the economy, especially in new markets created by the railroads and mines in states such as Sonora. These Chinese businesses were concentrated in and were dominant in Sonora and Baja California, but entrepreneurial opportunities brought Chinese into other places such as Nogales, Torreón and Monterrey. By 1910, the Chinese numbered 4,486 in Sonora alone, and were by far the largest numerous foreign presence. This concentration in certain towns and businesses gave the Chinese prominence despite the fact that they comprised only between one and two percent of the overall population in Sonora between 1910 and 1930. Initially, Chinese enterprises were welcomed and protected by municipal authorities because they generated revenue and provided necessary goods. While some large—scale businesses grew, most Chinese enterprises were small, selling goods in markets, in the streets and door to door.

The economic success of the Chinese in Sonora and other areas of Mexico came from its role as “middleman minority.” They filled strategic niches in Mexico's economy. Mexican society has traditionally been divided into rich and poor with no middle class. The American and other foreign entrepreneurs in the northern states constituted a high class, while the native Mexican population remained as the lower class. The Chinese, being neither, became a kind of middleman between the two classes. The Chinese's success was also due to a strong work ethic and frugality, but it was also due to informal and reciprocal work relationships mostly restricted to the ethnic community. Established Chinese in Mexico would hire incoming Chinese, especially from China itself, as a source of cheap and loyal labor. These new immigrants would gain business knowledge and experience along with their salaries. Many Chinese social networks developed in Mexico, especially in Mexicali which also produced a kind of informal money lending in the Chinese community, called “hui.”

As part of their integration into Mexican society, most Chinese adopted a Mexican first name then used their Chinese names as surnames, which was done by Chinese in many parts of Latin America. Some learned Spanish and sought naturalized Mexican citizenship. The Chinese of Mexicali started the Asociación China, a social organization partly devoted to obtaining Chinese wives from overseas. The group still remains to this day. However, most Chinese men did marry Mexican women, but they retained most of their customs and cultural heritage. Most of these marriages were to women known from business contacts with their families. In some cases, the marriages were encouraged by the Mexican woman's family, but in other cases secret relationships developed.

In Baja California, most Chinese initially migrated to Mexicali at the turn of the century and signed on as laborers for the Colorado River Land Company, a U.S. enterprise dedicated to building developing farmland along the Colorado River and its delta. These Chinese came from the U.S. and directly from China, lured by the promise of high wages which never materialized. The Americans did not directly supervise the initial clearing and irrigation work. They leased out parcels of 1,000 acres (4.0 km^{2}) to contractors, most of whom were Chinese, who would then contract Chinese labor to create cotton farms. By 1919, there were fifty Chinese-owned cotton farms occupying nearly 75,000 acres (300 km^{2}) producing 80% of the cotton grown in the Mexicali Valley. After the initial irrigation and clearing projects, many Chinese congregated in an area of Mexicali now known as La Chinesca. By 1920, ethnic Chinese residents outnumbered Mexicans 10,000 to 700. This area boomed during the Prohibition years when Americans crossed the border to drink and gamble. Eventually, La Chinesca housed virtually all the city's casinos, bordellos and opium dens.

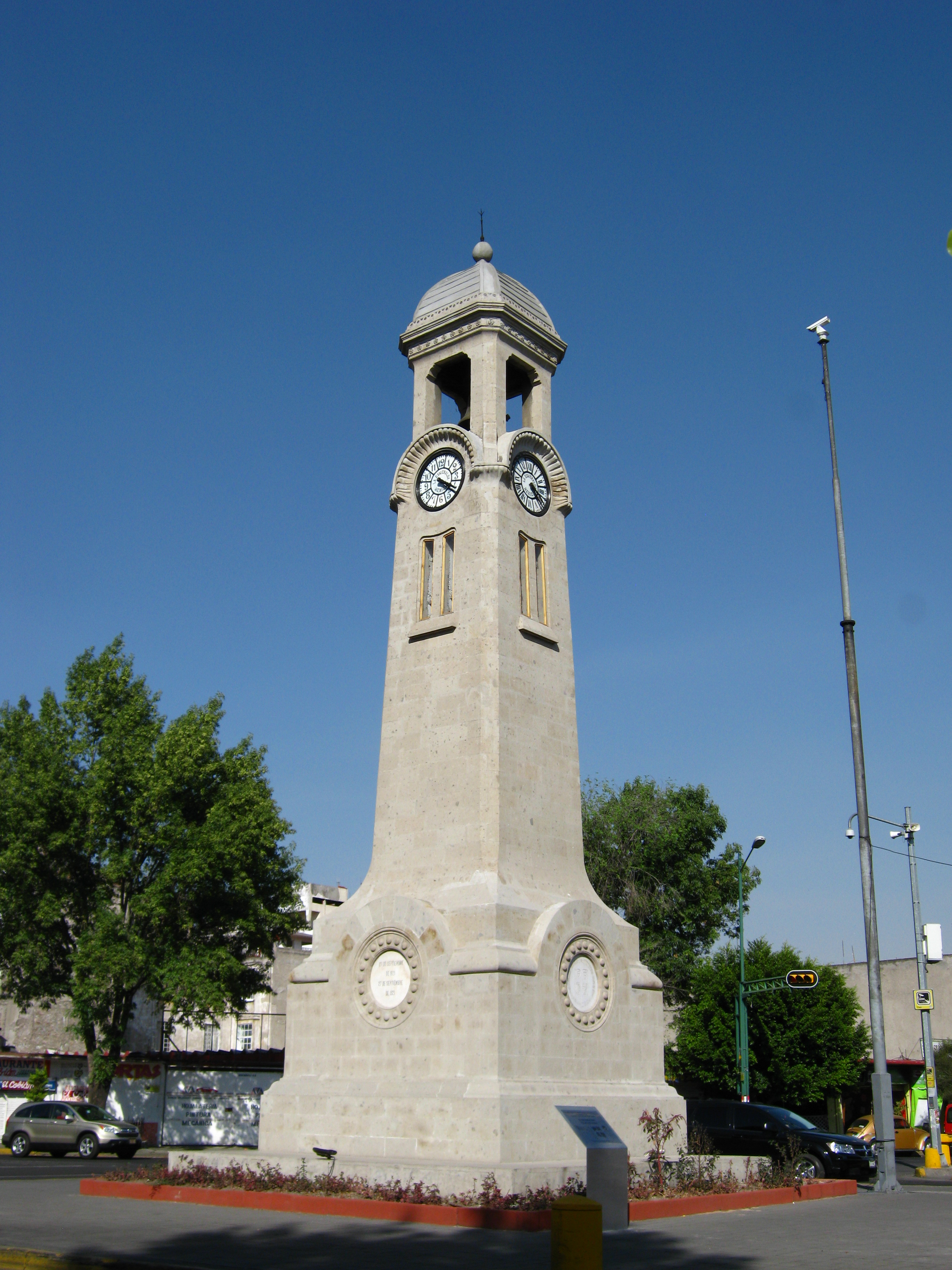
The Reloj Chino on Avenida Bucareli

Another area which formed a well-defined Chinese community was Mexico City. At the turn of the century, there were only 40 Chinese registered here, but by 1910, there were 1,482. By the 1920s, the community, centered on Dolores Street just south of the Alameda Central and Palacio de Bellas Artes, was firmly established and growing. One reason for this was that at the beginning of the Mexican Revolution, many Chinese in the north migrated south to here, both to flee the violence and the growing anti-Chinese sentiment. These people joined with the Chinese already living in the capital, who had businesses in which to employ the “new Chinese.” The Chinese community expanded by forming new businesses in and around the historic center of the city. One common business was the “café de chinos” or Chinese restaurantes serving both Chinese and Mexican food. These can still be found in Mexico City today. One area outside of “Barrio Chino” which became home to many Chinese business was Avenida Bucareli (Bucareli Avenue). Here a clock was built and donated by the Chinese community to commemorate the Centennial of Mexico's Independence in 1910. The original was destroyed during the Decena trágica of February 1913, but it was replaced.

In the 1920s, Chinese communities in Mexico, especially in Baja California, were numerous and politically powerful locally. However, they were also split into two factions, which roughly aligned with the political situation in China at the time. One was called the Chee Kung Tong (a more conservative group) and the other Partido Nacionalista China, who supported the more western movement of Sun Yat Sen. These two divided business territories, especially in areas such as casinos along the border and large markets. The political struggles between these two groups gave the Chinese a violent reputation, especially in northern Mexico.

During the period from 1895 to 1926, Chinese immigration grew rapidly, with the total Chinese population reaching more than 24,000 from a little over 1,000. However, expulsion and deportation in the 1930s would shrink this population to under 5,000 throughout Mexico in 1940.

== Anti-Chinese movement ==
An anti-Chinese movement emerged during the Mexican Revolution and peaked during the Depression. The experience and treatment of the Chinese in Mexico was similar to what they experienced in California in the second half of the 19th century. They were initially welcomed into unpopulated areas which needed large amounts of cheap manpower. The frontier situation in both areas also allowed the Chinese to carve out economic niches for themselves. The Chinese as a whole turned out to be hardworking, frugal, mutually supportive within their communities, and often succeeding as entrepreneurs in agriculture and small commercial enterprises. In both cases, when their numbers reached a certain percentage of the local population and when they attained a certain amount of monetary success, backlashes occurred on both sides of the border.

=== Mexican Revolution and Torreón Massacre ===
In both Sonora and the Mexicali area, the Chinese came to dominate the merchant class, with Mexicali the undisputed center of Chinese settlement, economics and culture in northwestern Mexico by 1925. At the same time, resentment and hostility was growing toward the Chinese by the native Mexican population. Anti-Chinese sentiment had been voiced before the Mexican Revolution that began in 1910. An anti-Chinese article was part of the 1905 platform of Liberal Party of Mexico (PLM). During the Mexican Revolution, violence against Chinese and their property occurred in the important rail junction of Torreón.

In May 1911, federal troops loyal to Porfirio Díaz that had controlled the city left and revolutionary troops supportive of Francisco I. Madero marched in. The Maderistas claimed the Chinese had "sniped" at them, and Mexican townspeople attacked individual Chinese and looted Chinese businesses. The brother of Francisco Madero, Emilio Madero, was a military commander and brought order to Torreón soon after he arrived, but by then over 300 Chinese had been killed in the Torreón massacre. Francisco Madero became president in November 1911.

The Revolution culminated in multifaceted effort to "Mexicanize" the country and economy, but European and U.S. nationals and their businesses were not targeted in the same way that the Chinese were. This effort to Mexicanize was strongest in the north. While Chinese persecution was mostly limited to the north, it had national implications, mostly due to the political clout of Revolution leaders coming out of the northern border states.

During the Mexican Revolution and the years after, a notion of "Mexicanness" (mexicanidad) was an important one politically and legally. Prior to the 1917 Constitution, people in Mexico were classed by race: white European, mestizo (mixed European and indigenous), indigenous and, to some extent African was acknowledged. This was a carryover from the colonial era caste system, which did not include Asians. After the Revolution, the mestizo was adopted as a kind of ideal or "cosmic" Mexican race. All foreigners were reminded of their outsider status by Revolution leaders and became targets of movements to end foreign influence in the country. This was an open expression of the resentment that built up in Mexico during the Porfirio Díaz years. During the Revolution, many Europeans and Americans in the country left. However, since the Chinese were still barred from the United States, their numbers actually increased.

As part of this nation-building effort, the notion of race was abolished by the time of the 1930 census. Prior census did take race into account and those of Chinese origin were so noted. However, the lack of a race category, plus the complicated laws concerning nationality blurred the line as to who was Mexican and who was not. This not only affected those who had immigrated from China, but also their Mexican wives and mixed-race children. Depending on when wives married their husbands and when children were born, among other factors, wives and children could be considered to be Chinese rather than Mexican nationals. While it cannot be proven that information taken from this census was used in the mass deportation of Chinese men and their families in the 1930s, their uncertain legal status reflected by it would give them little to no protection against deportations.

=== Rise of anti-Chinese sentiment ===
Anti-Chinese propaganda in Mexico was prominent in the early years of the 1900s through the 1930s and mimicked that of the United States in the 19th century. The Chinese were painted as without hygiene, and responsible for vices such as opium smoking and gambling. They were blamed for spreading diseases, degenerating the Mexican race, corrupting morals, inciting civil unrest and generally undermining Mexico's social and political makeup. Their lack of assimilation was also attacked. Another accusation was that Chinese men (and almost all Chinese immigrants in Mexico were men) had been stealing employment and Mexican women from Mexican men who had gone off to fight in the Revolution or in World War I.

However, the greatest resentment was economic. The Chinese were accused of competing unfairly for jobs, especially as the formerly empty northern states began to experience a surplus of labor both due to increasing population and cutbacks in industries such as mining and petroleum. After World War I and again during the Depression, the United States repatriated Mexican workers, which added to the problem. As for Chinese businesses, these were accused of competing unfairly and for illegal lending practices and excluding Mexican labor. Sentiment arose that jobs in Mexico should be reserved for Mexican workers. Various state and federal laws were enacted to this effect in the 1920s. This anti-Chinese sentiment spilled over onto those Mexicans who had business and social ties with the Chinese, being called "chineros" and "chineras." Marriages between Chinese men and Mexican women were banned in the early 1920s with women married to Chinese men being labeled as "traitors" to the nation and race.

=== Anti-Chinese movements ===
Overall resentment eventually grew into formal anti-Chinese movements in northern Mexico, with most of the people active in these groups coming from the same social class or even the same business circles as the targeted Chinese. Most of these groups were formed between 1922 and 1927, with names such as the Comité Pro-Raza and Comité Anti-Chino de Sinaloa. The first of these was the Commercial Association of Businessmen in the small mining town of Magdalena de Kino. It was led by José María Arana with the purpose of "defending Mexican merchants and rid Sonora of Chinese business owners. Collectively, these groups pushed for the exclusion or expulsion of Chinese-Mexicans. The first major convention of these groups took place in 1925 in Nogales and formed the Comité Directivo de Antichinismo Nacional. A second umbrella group, the Liga Nacional Obrera Antichina, was formed in Tamaulipas the same year. These groups, along with many in the state and federal governments, pushed laws to segregate Chinese, prohibit interracial marriage and eventually deportation. These groups were not considered to be illicit, but rather were tolerated and even accepted by state governments and even presidents such as Álvaro Obregón and Plutarco Elías Calles. Eventually, the federal government itself perceived Chinese migration as a national concern and commissioned various studies to address the alleged threats.

Hundreds of Chinese in northern Mexico were tortured and murdered in the 1920s and 1930s. The most serious act occurred earlier. It was the 1911 massacre of over 300 Chinese in Torreón, Coahuila, which was carried out by a faction of Pancho Villa's army. This army would sack Chinese homes and businesses as well. This event galvanized the anti-Chinese movement in Mexico. Francisco I. Madero offered to pay an indemnity of three million pesos to the Chinese government for the act but this never happened due to the coup by Victoriano Huerta.

=== Anti-Chinese sentiment in Sonora, Baja California and Mexico City ===
Owing to their visible presence, Chinese had experienced prejudice since they first arrived in Sonora. Negative attitudes and jokes abounded, and some people perceived Chinese as different and foreign. Anti Chinese sentiment first grew strong in Sonora and became the principal center of anti-Chinese campaigns in Mexico. The powerful political leadership of this state pushed the federal government to cancel further immigration from China in 1921, with the nullification of the Treaty of Amity, Commerce and Navigation, with all foreign manual labor prohibited eight years later. The Chinese consulate in Nogales was closed in 1922.

The strength of Chinese numbers in Mexicali afforded a certain amount of protection and made it a refuge for Chinese fleeing persecution in other areas, especially for Chinese in Sonora and Sinaloa after 1915. However, even here health and building codes were being selectively enforced against Chinese establishments in La Chinesca as early as 1925. The formal anti-Chinese organizations moved into Baja California in the 1930s, but it never had the strength it did in Sonora. The end of the Chinese era did not come until 1937 when President Lázaro Cárdenas expropriated most foreign land holdings and forced thousands of Chinese off of more than thirty large cotton farms. These Chinese were forced to move to Mexicali or out of the country.

In other areas, including Mexico City, Chinese were being forced to live in ghettos starting in the 1920s, separating them due to supposed hygiene and moral reasons. Despite efforts by anti-Chinese groups such as the Unión Nacionalista Mexicana and the Campaña Pro-raza de Distrito Federal against Chinese businesses and the beginning of expulsions from the country, the Chinese still managed to open business in and around the historic center of the city. They also took in Chinese fleeing from other parts of the country.

=== Deportations and expulsions ===
Early deportations of Chinese-Mexican leaders were authorized by Alvaro Obregón due to the violence between the Chinese factions in Mexicali in the 1920s. However, mass deportations did not occur until the 1930s, when nearly 70% of the country Chinese and Chinese-Mexican population was deported or otherwise expelled out of the country.

Mass expulsions were mostly carried out in Sonora and Sinaloa in part because of their large populations, but Chinese were deported from all over the country. Some were deported directly to China but many others were forced to enter the United States through the border with Sonora, even though Chinese exclusion laws were still in effect there. In a number of cases, Chinese were deported without having time to sell or otherwise settle their possessions in Mexico. The governor of Sonora Francisco S. Elías had judges removed if they issued "amparo" or protection orders in favor of Chinese being deported. The following governor, Rodolfo Elías Calles, was responsible for the expulsion of most Chinese-Mexican families into U.S. territories. Despite the diplomatic problems this caused, Elias Calles did not stop expelling these families until he himself was expelled from Sonora. However, by that time almost all of Sonora's Chinese-Mexicans had disappeared. By the 1940 census, only 92 Chinese were still living in Sonora, with more than two-thirds of these having acquired Mexican citizenship. This had the unintended consequence of nearly collapsing the Sonoran economy. The governor of Baja California, Abelardo L. Rodríguez would also actively participate in the deportation of Chinese in his state. The legal rationale was the violence associated with the two Chinese mafias but those not connected were being deported as well. The state of Sinaloa reduced its Chinese population from 2,123 to 165 in the same time period.

Many in the northern border states moved to other areas of Mexico in order to avoid being expelled from the country. Some fled to the states of Baja California or Chihuahua, where anti-Chinese movements were not as strong. Another place that many Chinese fled to was Mexico City. However, entire Chinese-Mexican families were escorted to the Sonoran border with the United States and expelled to Arizona, by being pushed through gaps in the border fence. This strained relations between Mexico and the United States. The U.S. held most of these families in immigration jails in the Southwest, then deported them to China. By 1934, the U.S. presented complaints from over 3,000 Chinese-Mexicans on foreign soil. In the end, Mexico paid only a fraction of the costs demanded from it by the U.S. government for deportations to China.

=== Chinese resistance ===
Severely affected by the Mexican government's racially discriminatory policies, Chinese Mexicans who were repatriated back to China are a central and surprising component of this transnational story. Far from agentless, however, the Chinese and their compatriots in Mexico collectively exerted effort in seeking justice and improving the lives of the deported in China, while also trying to help those still in Mexico. Numerous Chinese associations formed to create bonds with networks of Chinese across the globe played a significant role in aiding the Chinese Mexicans. Working closely with the repatriated Chinese, these associations provided money and shelter for the repatriated Chinese, served as an advocate for them, and constantly urged the Chinese government to provide aid and protest the Mexican government. Their efforts paid off. Not only did Chinese officials ultimately heed their voice, but some even became members of these associations to further the mission of aiding the Chinese in Mexico. On numerous occasions, officials in China's Ministry of Foreign Affairs protested the Mexican government with frequent but not uniformly positive results. The Chinese expats in Mexico, along with their allies in China, created a paradigm of transnational resistance against Mexican Sinophobia underpinned by transpacific contact.

== Chinese Mexican community in Guangdong and Macau ==
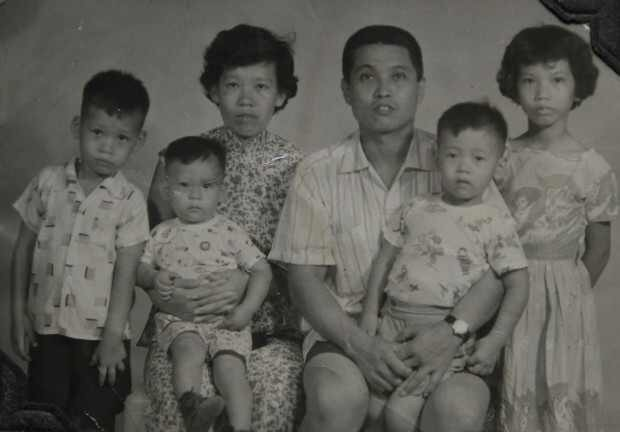
Juan Chiu Trujillo, third from right, and his wife and children. When he was five, Chiu Trujillo, his siblings and parents were vacationing in Guangdong, China and became stranded there once Mexico started the expulsion of Chinese-Mexicans. The family fled to Macau in 1941 to escape the turmoil of WWII. He was repatriated to Mexico in 1960 at age 35 along with his Chinese wife and children.

Faced with persecution and mass deportations, many voluntarily left Mexico for China. Those who left involuntarily were mostly those rounded up as entire families and either sent directly to China or forced to cross the border illegally into the United States. This included Mexican women married to Chinese men and their mixed-race children. After arriving in China, most Chinese-Mexican families settled in Guangdong Province and Portuguese Macau, developing Chinese-Mexican enclaves. Macau was attractive for these refugees because it had a cosmopolitan atmosphere more accepting of mixed race unions and its Portuguese influence gave it a familiar Latin cultural aspect. It was also home to many different types of refugees in the early 20th century as its population doubled to 150,000 people. The Catholic Church in Macau became crucial to this community as a place to meet, meet others, make connections back to Mexico, and find spiritual and economic support.

Most in the community never accepted their expulsion from Mexico and would struggle for years for the right to return to Mexico. These people's identity as "Mexican" became more salient as they experienced the hardships of China in the 20th century, living through the Japanese invasion of World War II, the Second Sino-Japanese War, the Communist Revolution, and the Cold War. For the Mexican women, life was especially difficult as gender norms in China were very different from Mexico. Some of their husbands already had wives in China and they found themselves relegated to second wife or concubine status. This would often lead to break-ups with Mexican-Chinese children divided between households.

The size of the Chinese Mexican community in Macau and Guangdong fluctuated over the 20th century as some moved to other places in China and others managed to return to Mexico. The community became spread out in this region and moved around. By the late 1950s, the community was well-enough known in this part of China that the phrase "being like a Mexican" came to mean someone who is poor and stateless.

== Repatriation ==
While in China, Chinese Mexicans campaigned to be allowed to return to Mexico from the 1930s to the 1960s. Renouncing and or disregarding their Chinese heritage was part of this, especially in the Cold War era. Among the reasons Chinese-Mexican families were pushed to do this were that the problems they faced in China — including economic hardships, alienation from Chinese culture and the upheavals that occurred in that country — made Mexico a far more desirable place to live. To press their case, Chinese-Mexican related their mixed race status to the concept of "mestizaje", the Mexican nation's notion that its identity is based on the blending of races and cultures.

From the early 1930s to at least the 1980s, smaller groups immigrated to Mexico. The first major success occurred when Lázaro Cárdenas permitted the return of at least 400 Mexican women and many more Mexican Chinese children in 1937 and 1938. Their Chinese husbands and fathers, however, were not permitted to return.

In the late 1950s, the Lions Club in Mexico became involved in the campaign to repatriate Chinese-Mexicans. This organization has been traditionally identified with middle-class professionals, businessmen, and others who had supported the expulsion of the Chinese a generation earlier. However, these same groups were now also anti-Communist, and so this aspect of the effort was to liberate Mexicans from a communist government. Branches of this organization in the northern states wrote letters to the federal government pressuring them to document and repatriate these Mexican nationals in China. This led to the second major repatriation under President Adolfo López Mateos in 1960. Although there was still resistance to the return of Chinese-Mexicans, especially in Sonora, the work of the Lions Club and others was able to overcome this.

== Chinese Mexicans today ==
As of 2024, there is an estimated 70,000 people of Chinese descent living in Mexico. There are two major Chinese communities or "Chinatowns" in Mexico today: La Chinesca in Mexicali and Barrio Chino in Mexico City. Tensions remain, however. Chinese in Mexico who do business with partners in China are often seen as a threat to national interests. This concern especially emanates from manufacturers unable to compete with Chinese imports, and is evident in antagonistic news media and acts of hostility against Chinese businesses.

=== Mexicali ===
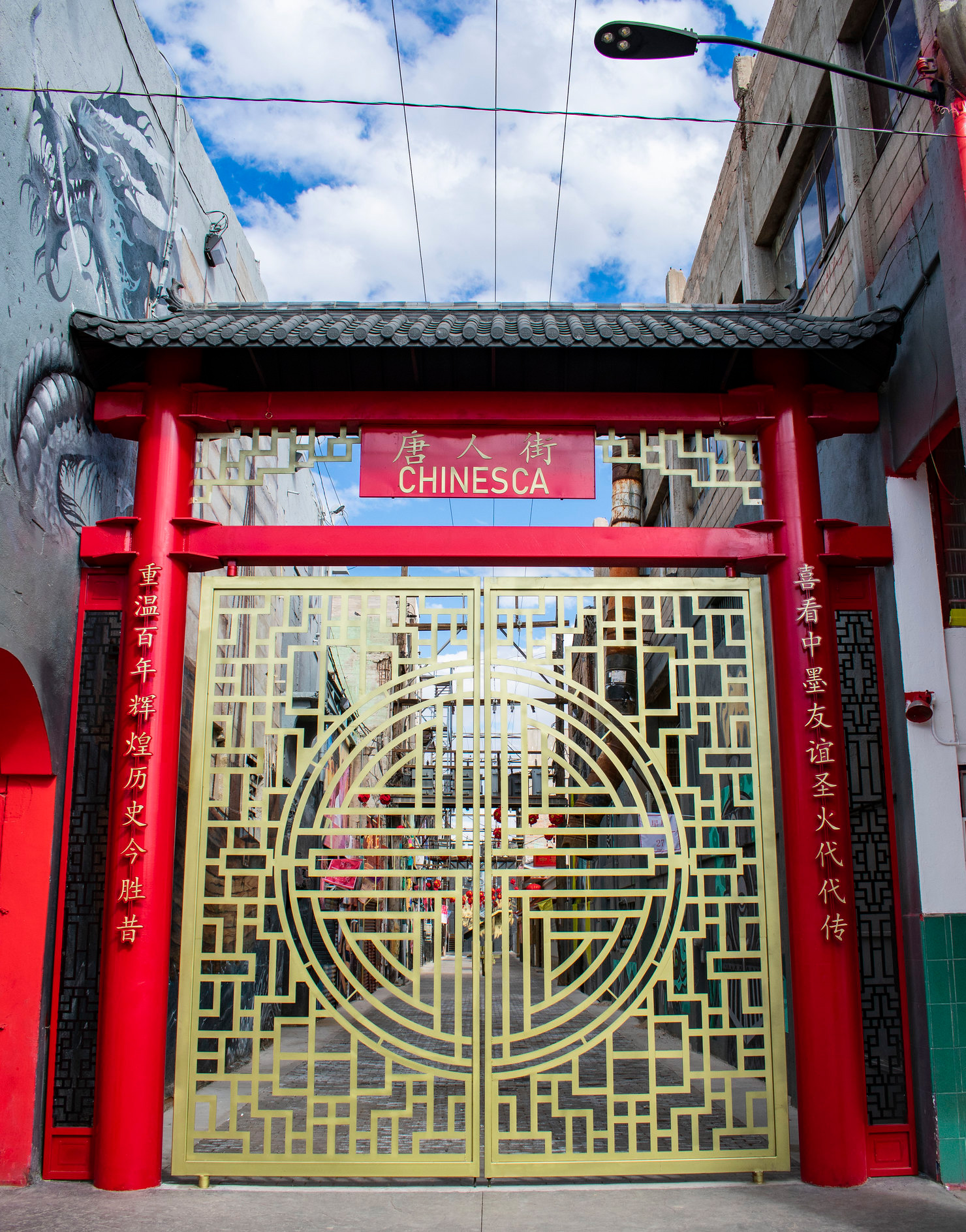
Entrance to the callejón de la Chinesca, a refurbished alley in La Chinesca with 14 murals depicting the history and culture of the Chinese community of Mexicali

La Chinesca in Mexicali is the largest Chinese enclave in Mexico. Many repatriated Chinese settled there as well as refugees from the defeated Nationalist China. Few new Chinese came to the city since the mid-20th century, and many Mexicans have moved in, diluting the Chinese population which was already heavily mixed. There are about 10,000 full-blooded Chinese, down from 35,000 in the 1920s, and perhaps 50,000 of Chinese descent. Intermarriage with other Mexicans is common. Chinese Mexicans in Mexicali consider themselves equally "cachanilla," a term used for locals, as other residents of the city, even if they speak Cantonese in addition to Spanish. Chinese-Mexicans still stand out there as owners of retail establishments, service industries, and real estate concerns.

Mexicali still has more Chinese, mostly Cantonese, restaurants per capita than any other city in Mexico, with over a thousand in the city. This cuisine has incorporated other Mexican practices over time. Most dishes are served with a small bowl of a condiment much like steak sauce, which is an addition from northern Mexican cuisine. Chinese dishes are also supplemented with tortillas, seasoned rice and barbecued meats.

La Chinesca survives as the center of Chinese-Mexican identity and culture. Local Chinese associations work to preserve the Chinese language and culture through classes in Cantonese, calligraphy and the sponsorship of Chinese festivals. However, few live in this area of town anymore. It has deteriorated along with the rest of the historic city center. Most of those with Chinese heritage live in the south and west of the city, along with the rest of the population. Attempts to revitalize La Chinesca and make it an attraction for tourists have not been successful.

=== Mexico City ===
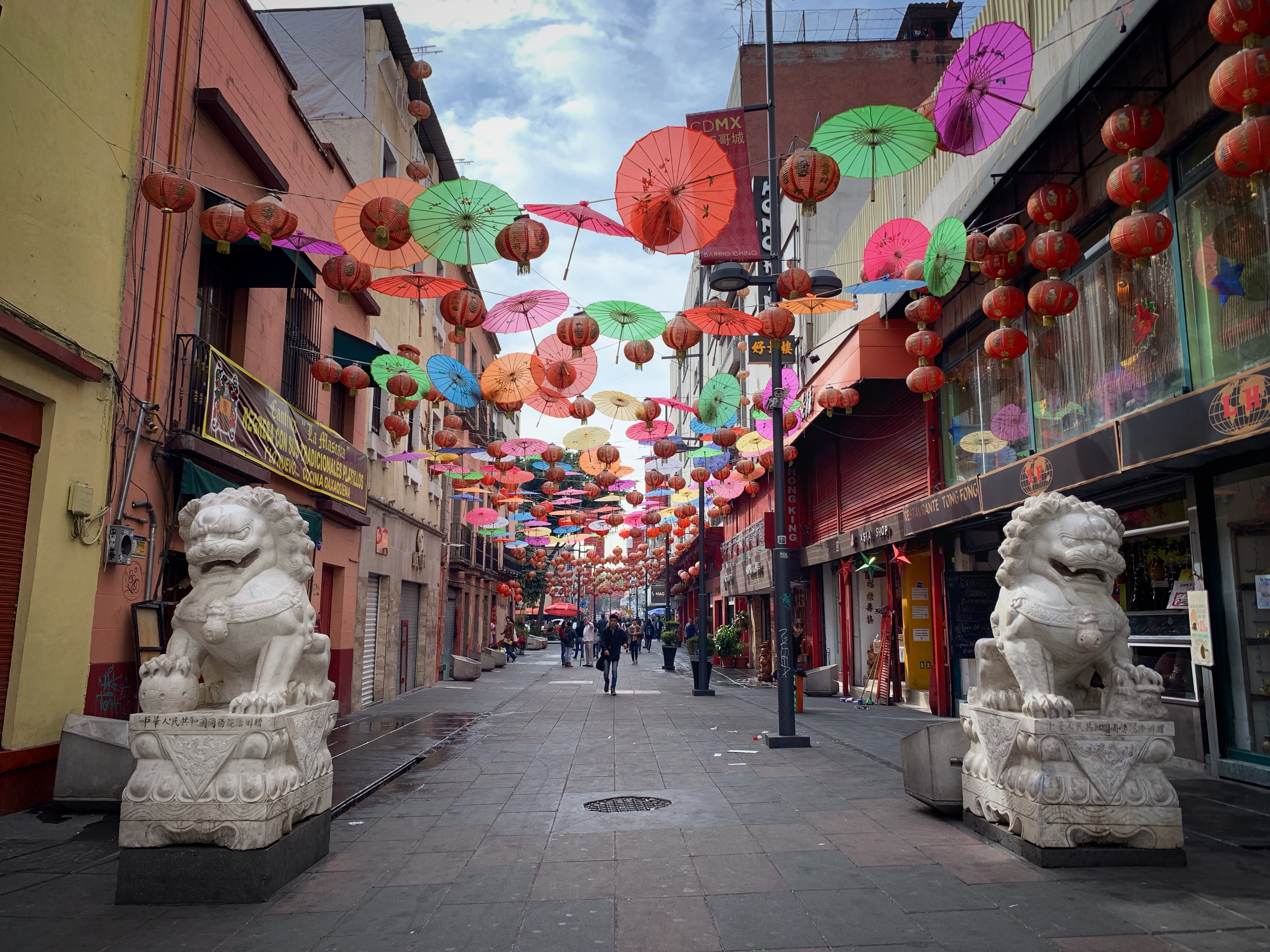
Dolores Street, flanked by Chinese guardian lions, in the Barrio Chino of Mexico City

The Barrio Chino is a small Chinese enclave in Mexico City. The Barrio Chino today is only two blocks along Dolores Street and extends only one block east and west of the street, with only seven restaurants and a few import businesses as of 2003. The buildings in the Barrio Chino are no different from the rest of the city, but businesses here are typically either restaurants or importers. Most of the shops and restaurants here have abundant Chinese-style decorations and altars, but statues of the Virgin of Guadalupe and San Judas Tadeo (a popular saint in Mexico) can be seen as well.

Other than the expulsion of the Chinese in the 1930s, another reason for the small size of this Chinatown is that the Chinese-Mexican population of Mexico City has mixed with other Mexicans and is spread out in the city. According to the government of Mexico City, about 3,000 families in the city have Chinese heritage. In many parts of the older sections of the city, there are "cafes de chinos" (Chinese cafes), which are eateries that serve Chinese and Mexican food. More recently, Chinese restaurants in the city have begun to offer two menus: Chinese-Mexican cuisine familiar to Mexicans and traditional Chinese dishes that cater mostly to recent immigrants.

- Most recent immigrants congregate further south in the Viaducto neighborhood, with the Barrio Chino no longer serving as an entry point for new arrivals. However, the Barrio Chino remains the symbolic home for many of the city's Chinese-Mexicans, who congregate there for camaraderie and to pass on their culture. The Comunidad China de México, A.C., established in 1980, sponsors Chinese festivals, classes and other activities to preserve and promote Chinese-Mexican culture. The largest annual event by far is the Chinese New Year's celebration, which not only does attracts thousands of visitors from the rest of the city, but also has major sponsors such as the Cuauhtemoc borough and Coca-Cola.

== Notable people ==
- Ana Gabriel - singer and songwriter.
- Miguel Ángel Osorio Chong - politician and former Secretary of the Interior.
- Jorge Carlos Patrón Wong - figure in the Catholic Church in Mexico.
- Lizbeth Gamboa - politician.
- Huang Yiguang - politician, aviator, and explorer
- Federico Fong - musician
- Su Muy Key - actress and dancer
- Lyn May - actress and singer
- Jenny Chiu - reporter and former soccer player
- Juan Wong - football player
- Eduardo Auyón - artist and cultural promoter
- Sugi Sito - wrestler
- Juan Manuel Ley López - businessman
- Bruce Chun - cinematographer
- Jesús Alberto Chong - boxer
- Francisco Javier Mar Hernández - wrestler
- Zhenli Ye Gon - businessman; alleged drug trafficker

== See also ==
- China–Mexico relations
- Chinatowns in Latin America
- Demographics of Mexico
- Immigration to Mexico
- Overseas Chinese
- Chinese immigration to Mexico
- The Chinese in Mexico
- Buddhism in Mexico
