= La Chinesca =

Chinese community in Mexicali, Mexico

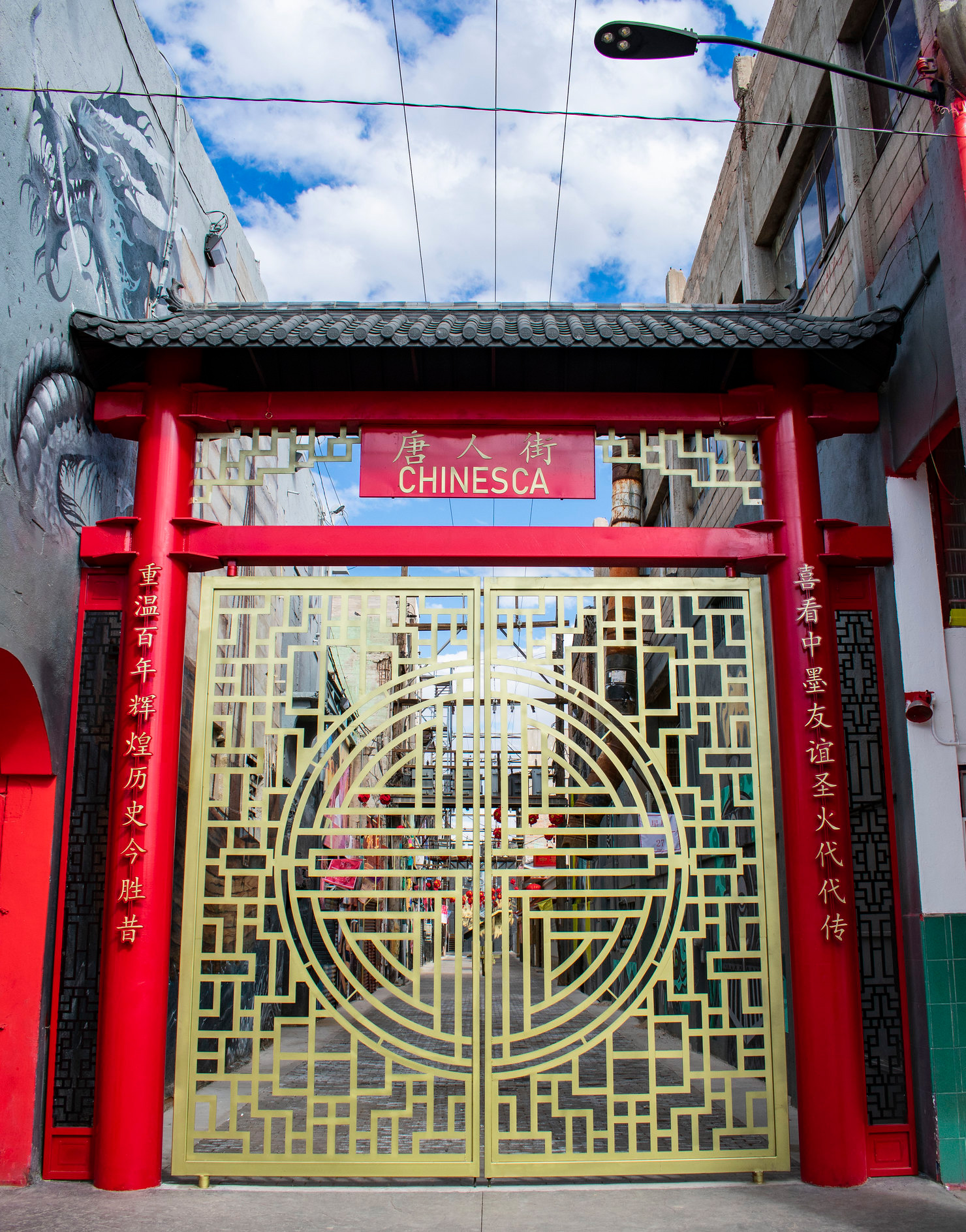
Entrance to the Chinesca Alley (Spanish: callejón de la Chinesca, a refurbished alley in La Chinesca with 14 murals depicting the history and culture of the Chinese community of Mexicali

La Chinesca (The Mexican Chinatown) is a neighborhood located in the Mexican city of Mexicali. The location is home to about 15,000 people of Chinese origin, historically the largest Chinese community in Mexico. While this number does not compare to other cities worldwide with a prominent Chinese diaspora, early in the 20th century Mexicali was numerically and culturally more Chinese than other immigrant groups. The Chinese arrived to the area as laborers for the Colorado River Land Company, an American enterprise which designed and built an extensive irrigation system in the Valley of Mexicali. Some immigrants came from the United States, often fleeing anti-Chinese policies there, while others sailed directly from China.

== History ==
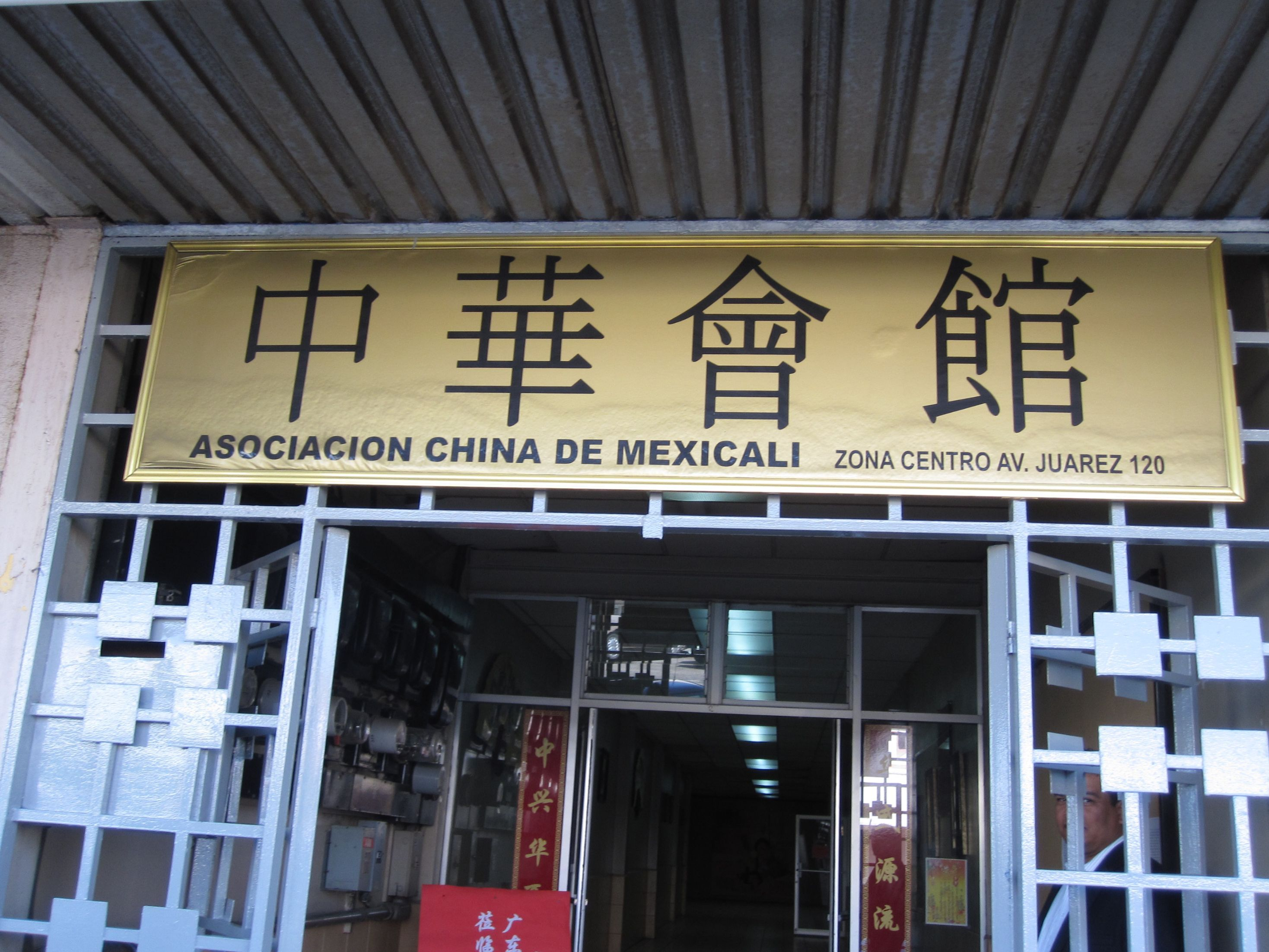
The Chinese Association of Mexicali (Spanish: Asociación China de Mexicali) provides connection and support to the Chinese community of Mexicali, in 2010

Many of the Chinese laborers who came to the irrigation system stayed on after its completion, congregating in an area of Mexicali today known as Chinesca. During Prohibition in the United States, many Chinese laborers and farmers came to the town to open bars, restaurants and hotels to cater their American clients, Chinesca eventually housed just about all of the city's casinos and bars, and a tunnel system to connect bordellos and opium dens to Calexico on the U.S. side. Bootleggers also used this route to supply the U.S. with alcohol purchased in Mexico.

By 1920, Mexicali's Chinese population outnumbered the Mexican 10,000 to 700. A group of 5,000 single Chinese males started the Asociación China, a Mexicali social organization at least partly devoted to finding Chinese wives from overseas. This organization remains active to present day. In 1927, a series of Tong wars here and other parts of Northern Mexico erupted over control of gambling and prostitution rings. Mexican alarm over the Chinese organized crime led to the government-encouraged Movimiento Anti-Chino. In the late 1920s, a wave of anti-immigrant sentiment that swept the country and led to the torture and murder of hundreds of Chinese in northern Mexico. However, the Chinese in this city were numerous enough and politically strong enough to protect themselves.

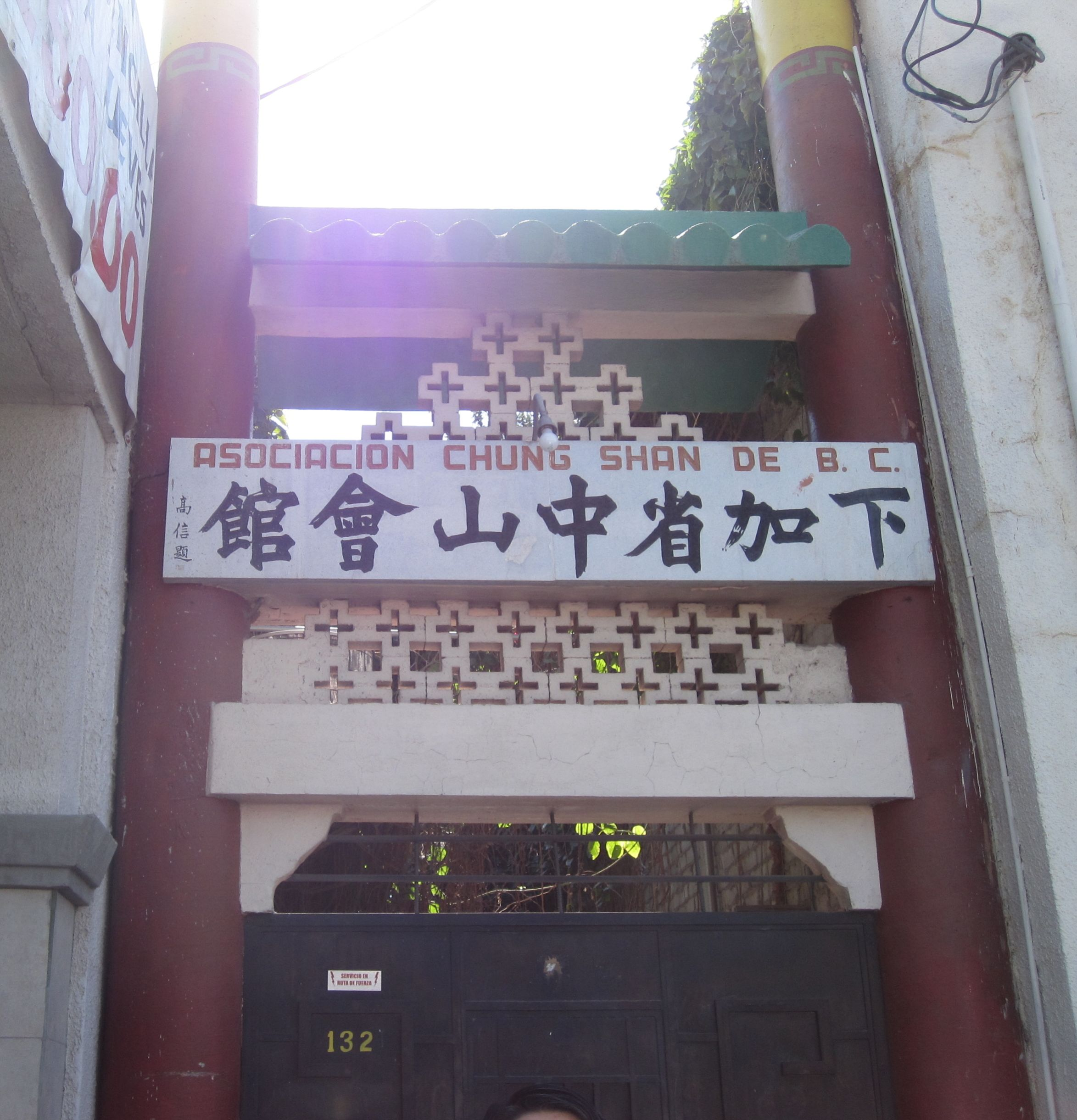
Asociación Chung Shan de Baja California, which serves as an educational center, art center, and Buddhist temple. Founded in 1915.

The percentage of Chinese was so high here that in the 1940s the town had only two cinemas, both of which played Chinese movies almost exclusively. However, in the later half of the 20th century, steady influx of Mexican migrants here diluted the Chinese population, until once again they became a minority.

After anti-Chinese sentiment faded, more Chinese arrived here, and it became the Mexican headquarters for the Kuomintang, or the Nationalist Chinese Party and the Anti-Communist League. After events during World War II and the Chinese Communist Revolution, a large number of Chinese refugees came to Mexico in the mid-century. Ho Feng-Shan, the Chinese diplomat known as "China's Schindler" is known to have visited Mexicali. The town was the site of the Taiwan based Republic of China consulate in the 1960s until Mexico withdrew its recognition of the island nation, ending immigration of ethnic Chinese to this area. For a while after 1960, Chinese Mexican community organizations continued to stay strong: at the beginning of the 1960s new Chinese Mexican seminaries continued to open, and in the 1970s a school opened to teach art, Chinese culture, and sports to Chinese Mexicans living in downtown Mexicali.

== Neighborhood ==
La Chinesca exists near the U.S. border close to the intersection of Avenida Madero and Calle Melgar. The neighborhood boasts more Chinese restaurants per capita than any other place in Mexico, more than 100 for the whole city, most with Cantonese-style cuisine. Local Chinese associations struggle to preserve the arts and culture of the homeland through the sponsorship of Chinese festivals, calligraphy clubs, and language classes. However, much of Chinese cultural life here has blended with local Mexican and American traditions to create a unique, hybrid culture.

Like many Chinese restaurants outside of Asia, cooks here have adapted their native cuisine to local tastes. For example, restaurants here serve their dishes with a small bowl of a sauce that is similar to a steak sauce, common in Northern Mexico. In many of these restaurants, it is not uncommon to see Chinese men wearing stiff straw cowboy hats, meeting over hamburgers and green tea and speaking a mixture of Cantonese and Spanish. Along with burgers and chow mein, many restaurants here also offer shark-fin tacos.

Since 2000, new migrants from China to Mexicali come from many of the same areas as before 1960, with perhaps 90% from Guangdong or Hong Kong.

The following are Chinese associations and organizations based in Mexicali (Auyon Gerardo 2003:89-102). The associations are formed according to regional origin, surname, occupation, religion, or other characteristics.

- Asociación China de Mexicali (中華會館): The main Chinese organization of Mexicali. Founded 1919. Avenida Juárez #120.
- Ming Chih Tang (中國洪門民治黨): Also called the Logia Masónica China en Baja California, Numero 20. Founded 1914. This group helped found the Asociación China de Mexicali (中華會館).
- Kuomintang (中國國民黨): Founded 1920. 600 members in 1928.
- Asociación Chung Shan de Baja California: Founded in 1915 with 200 members. Membership based on regional origin from Zhongshan. Branches were opened in Ensenada and Tijuana in 1963.
- Asociación Sam Egap de B.C. (三邑會館): Membership based on regional origin from Sam Yup.
- Asociación Leon Chong How Tong (梁忠孝堂): Membership based on surname Leon (梁).
- Asociación Hoy Yin (海晏公所): Membership based on regional origin from Haiyan, part of Taishan municipality.
- Asociación Chew Lun (昭倫公所): Membership based on surnames Tam, Tham, Hiu, Che. Founded in 1920.
- Asociación Lim Sei Ho Tong (林西河堂): Membership based on surname Lim.
- Asociación Ma Kiem Tu Tong: Membership based on surname Ma.
- Asociación Yee Fong Toy Tong (余風采堂): Membership based on surname Yee.
- Asociación Chee Puen Ko Tong (朱沛國堂): Membership based on surname Chee.
- Asociación Sui Yue Tong (遡源堂): Membership based on surnames Luis, Fon, Kon.
- Asociación Hu Suy Shan Tong (伍胥山堂): Membership based on surname Hu.
- Asociación Wong Kong Har Tong (黃江夏堂): Membership based on surnames Wong and Hu.
- Asociación Wong Wun Sun (黃雲山公所): Membership based on surname.
- Asociación Nam Ping (南平公所): Membership based on regional origin from Enping.
- Asociación Long Kong (龍岡親義公所): Membership based on surnames Liu, Kuan, Chiong, Chio.
- Asociación Lon Sai (隴西公所): Membership based on surnames Kuan, Pan, Lee, Chu.
- Asociación Gee How Oak Tin (至孝篤親公所): Membership based on surnames Chan, Wo, Yen.
- Asociación Lun Tack Tong: Membership based on surname Loo.
- Asociación Chi Tak Tong (至德公所): Membership based on surnames Chiu, Choi, Hu, Cao, Yon.
- Asociación Yat Juan: Membership based on regional origin from Kaiping.

Other organizations include (Auyon Gerardo 2003:105-115):

- Escuela China de Mexicali
- Club Shung Wah
- Boletín de la Colonia China
- Periódico Kiu Lum (seminario)
- Academia Chung Shan
- Centro de la Investigación de la Cultura China de Baja California

== See also ==
- Chinese immigration to Mexicali
- La Mesa
- Barrio Chino
