= Viaducto Piedad =

Coordinates: 19°24′N 99°08′W

Viaducto Piedad is a colonia in the Iztacalco borough of Mexico City, Mexico. Its name comes from Viaducto Miguel Alemán, a primary thoroughfare in Mexico City, and from the former De la Piedad River, which now runs in a culvert underneath the highway. It is served by the Viaducto metro station of the Mexico City Metro.

The neighborhood has a significant population of Chinese immigrants, making it the second of Mexico City's Chinatowns in addition to Barrio Chino.
