= Chinatowns in Latin America and the Caribbean =

Chinatown
- Chinese: 唐人街
- Hakka: Tongˇ nginˇ gieˊ
Transcriptions
Standard Mandarin
- Hanyu Pinyin: Tángrénjiē
Hakka
- Romanization: Tongˇ nginˇ gieˊ

Alternative Chinese name
- Traditional Chinese: 中國城
- Simplified Chinese: 中国城
- Hakka: Zungˊ guedˋ sangˇ
Transcriptions
Standard Mandarin
- Hanyu Pinyin: Zhōngguóchéng
Hakka
- Romanization: Zungˊ guedˋ sangˇ

Second alternative Chinese name
- Traditional Chinese: 華埠
- Simplified Chinese: 华埠
- Hakka: Faˇ pu
Transcriptions
Standard Mandarin
- Hanyu Pinyin: Huábù
Hakka
- Romanization: Faˇ pu

Chinatowns in Latin America (Spanish: barrios chinos, singular barrio chino / Portuguese: bairros chineses, singular bairro chinês) emerged during the rise of Chinese immigration to Latin America in the 19th century. Many immigrants arrived as contract laborers, often under indentured servitude, to work in the agricultural and fishing sectors. The majority came from Guangdong Province in southern China.

Since the 1970s, new waves of Chinese migrants have predominantly originated from Hong Kong, Macau, and Taiwan. Latin American Chinatowns are typically composed of both the descendants of early migrants—many of whom are of mixed Chinese and Latino heritage—and more recent arrivals from East Asia. Most Asian Latin Americans trace their ancestry to Cantonese and Hakka communities.

While estimates vary, the number of people of Chinese descent in Latin America is believed to be at least 1.4 million, and likely significantly higher.

Unlike the Chinatowns of Anglo America and Europe, pure-blood ethnic Chinese were relatively few in number but now increasing rapidly due to generally lower levels of Chinese immigration to some parts of Latin America. Residents of Latin American Chinatowns tend to be multilingual. Latin America's Chinatowns include those of Mexico City, Havana, Buenos Aires, and Lima. Some of these Chinatowns mainly serve as tourist attractions and not as true, living ethnic communities. The Chinatown of Havana, Cuba's is largely multi-generation Spanish-speaking Chinese Cuban whereas the Chinatown of the Belgrano district of Buenos Aires, Argentina consists of many first-generation Holo- and Mandarin-speaking immigrants from Taiwan.

Politically, several nations of Latin America recognize the government of the Republic of China in Taiwan. A Chinese arch was presented as a gift to the Barrio Chino of Panama City, following the visit of Panama by the then Taiwanese President Lee Teng-hui. After the major official visit by the Cuban Revolution's Fidel Castro to the People's Republic of China in 1995, materials were given for the new Chinese arch on Calle Dragone in Havana's Barrio Chino.

== Argentina ==
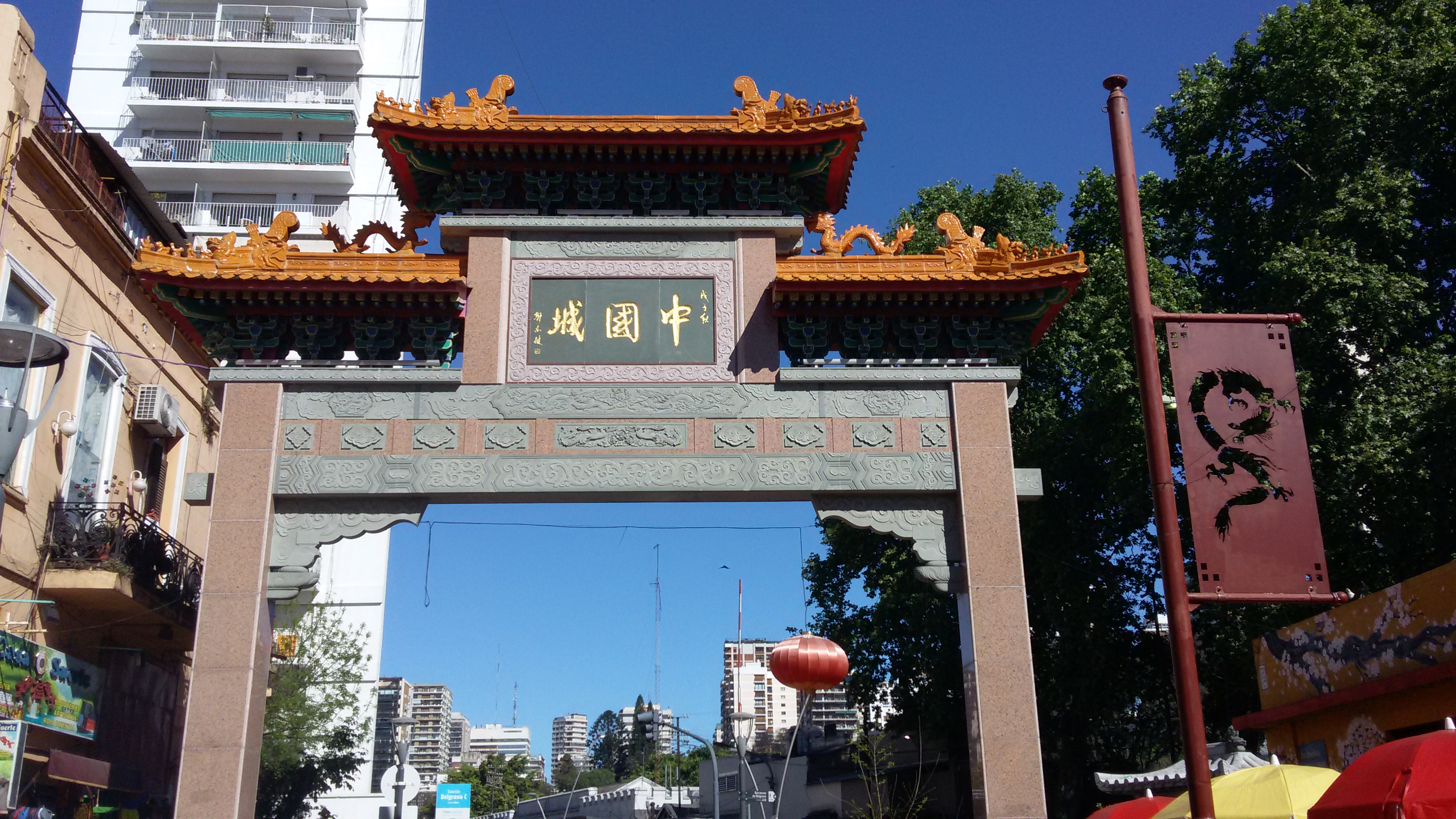
Barrio Chino in Buenos Aires

It is centered on Arribeños, Mendoza and Montañeses Streets, in the middle-class neighbourhood of Belgrano, Buenos Aires. Large numbers of recent Taiwanese and Mainland Chinese immigrants have settled in the area. Also included are ethnic Chinese from other parts of the Americas and East Asia, and Asians of non-Chinese ancestry, mainly Japanese and Korean, whose first immigrants date from WWII and the Korean war. As of 2018, the community was made up of 200,000 people.

== Brazil ==
A significant population of Chinese Brazilians live in Liberdade area in São Paulo. There are 250 thousands Chinese immigrants or descendants living in Brazil. Many Chinese immigrants settled in São Paulo following the end of the Chinese Civil War in 1949. While most of the Chinese in Brazil descend from Mainland China, many also descend from the Taiwanese, while some of them are descended from Hong Kong and Macau.

== Cuba ==
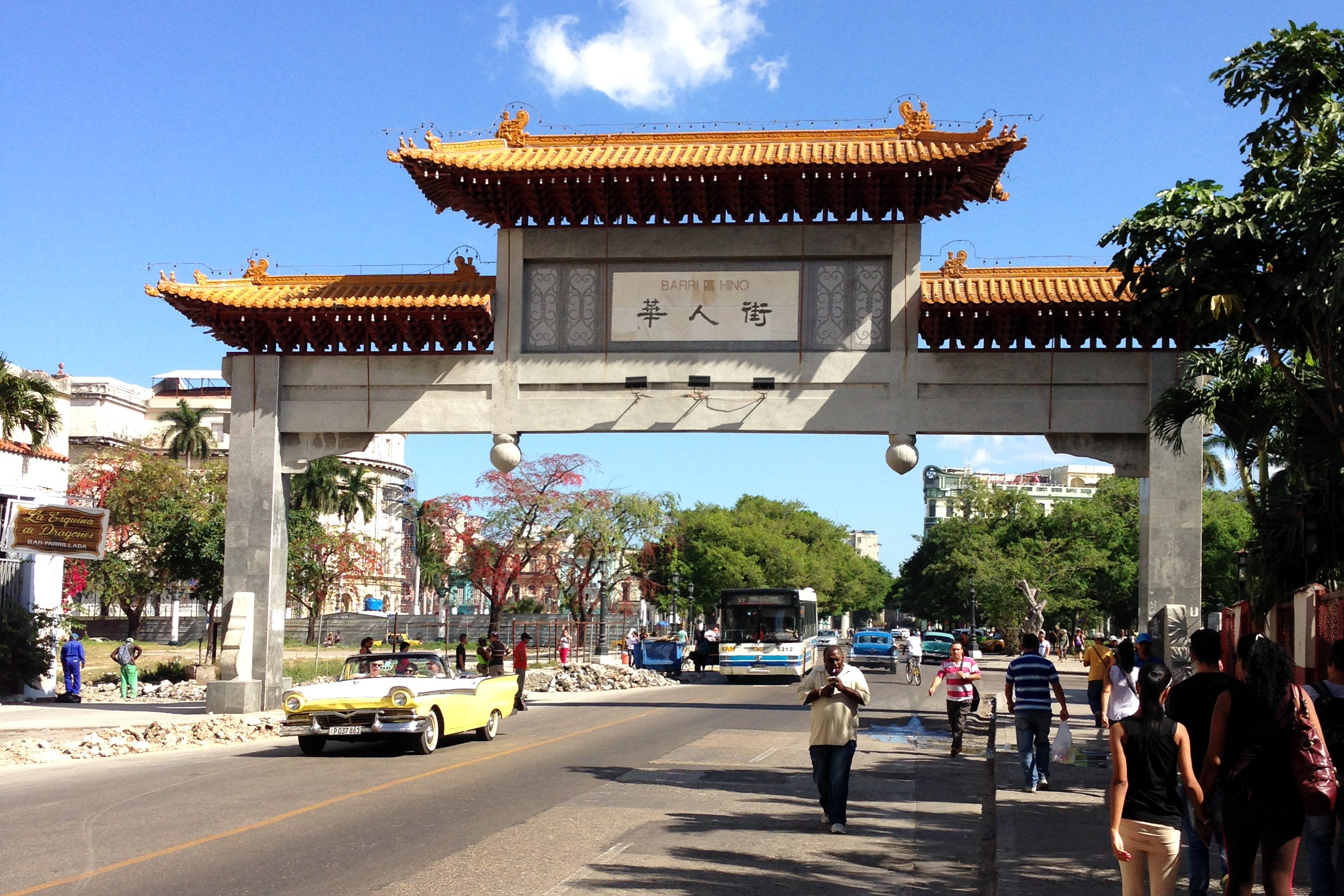
Chinatown Gate in Havana

Chinese immigration to Cuba started in 1847 when Spanish settlers brought in Cantonese contract workers to work in the sugar fields. Hundreds of thousands of Chinese workers were brought in from China, Hong Kong, Macau, and Taiwan during the following decades to replace the labor of African slaves. After completing 8-year contracts, the Chinese immigrants generally settled permanently in Cuba, where their descendants have since intermarried with local Cubans.

Unlike that of Argentina and other Latin American countries, the overseas Chinese population of Cuba was once large, but the now-diminished Chinese Cuban community is today clustered around the largely dying Barrio Chino — called Barrio Chino de La Habana — on Calle Zanja, in Havana. After the Cuban Revolution of 1959, many Chinese Cuban entrepreneurs fled the country for the United States. Since the 1960s, Cuba has not attracted very many, if any, Chinese immigrants (developments or redevelopments of Chinatowns tend to require much private investments for which political conditions in Cuba are not favorable).

Only one Chinese-language newspaper, Kwong Wah Po, remains in Cuba. Havana's Chinatown was formerly among the largest in Latin America as the neighborhood comprised 44 square blocks during its prime. To tie in with the Revolution's economic reliance on tourism, attempts have recently been launched to attract revitalization investment for the Chinatown from Mainland Chinese state-run enterprises and overseas Chinese private investors, particularly Chinese Canadians.

== Chile ==
Between 1,200 and 1,500 Chinese workers in Peru offered support to the Chilean side in the War of the Pacific (1879–1883) and thus went to Chile at the war's end.

Most Chinese shops, supermarkets, and restaurants located in Barrio Patronato neighborhood in Santiago. However, some Chinese businesses can also be found in shopping centers such as Santiago Centro and Estación Central.

== Colombia ==
The city of Cali has the largest Asian community because of its proximity to the Pacific Coast. The Chinese population can also be found in Barranquilla and Medellín. A small Chinatown exist in capital city Bogotá, especially in San Victorino area.

== Dominican Republic ==
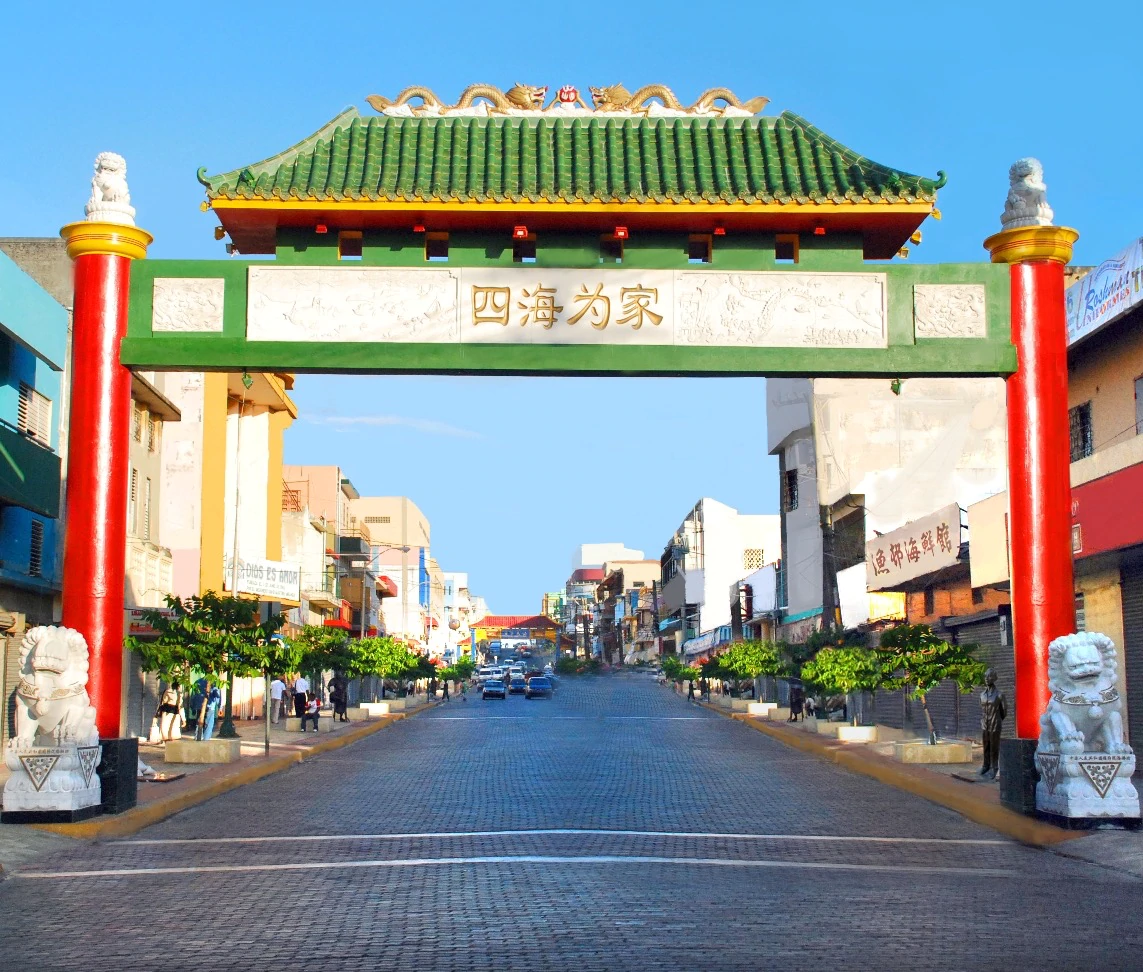
Barrio Chino - China Town in Santo Domingo

The first recorded mention of a Chinese presence in the Dominican Republic was in 1864 during the Dominican Restoration War, with references to a man called “Pancho el Chino,” who fought in the War. There are also reports that a businessman named Gregorio Riva brought a handful of Chinese laborers over from Cuba to make bricks and quicklime in the Cibao region. This group of Chinese immigrants eventually built warehouses in Samaná, Yuna and Moca. By 1870 the Chinese migrants had built the cemetery in Moca. By 1878 the presence of Chinese-Dominicans in Puerto Plata had increased thanks to the work of General Segundo Imbert, who was Governor of Puerto Plata.

A large influx of Chinese came during the American occupation of the Dominican Republic in 1916 to 1924, when ethnic Chinese came over to take part in the rapid economic expansion that resulted from the occupation. In 1937, more Chinese migrants that came to the Dominican Republic due to the Second Sino-Japanese War. In 1944 an official Chinese office was opened in the Dominican Republic and in 1945 a branch of the Chinese Nationalist Party was also opened. By the 1950s Chinese-Dominicans had established a small niche in the Duarte area of Santo Domingo and most of the businesses in that part of the city were Chinese-owned. Since Chinese migration had declined during the 1960s and 1970s, the community's growth was limited.

The original idea for a Chinatown in Santo Domingo was conceived in the early 1990s, but it took some years before the idea was to materialize. Chinatown took one step closer to becoming a reality when the organization Flor Para Todos was recognized. The area where the China Town is located, has been inhabited by Chinese immigrants for decades.

On 8 December 2004, through an agreement with the Santo Domingo municipal authorities, the Foundation was given the go-ahead to start construction on the project. Aside from the agreement with the city municipality, agreements with the Tourism Ministry were signed to promote Chinatown as a tourist attraction, agreements with the Culture Ministry were signed in order to develop cultural activities and an agreement with the Police Department was signed in order to increase police protection in the area. Santo Domingo's Chinatown was officially inaugurated as a Chinatown in 2006.

== French Guiana ==
There is a Chinatown in Cayenne, French Guiana.

== Jamaica ==
Kingston, Jamaica has a Chinatown/Chinese-influenced district. Jamaica has a history of Chinese, chiefly Hakka people from Guangdong province, and currently form less than 0.2% of the country's population, (6,000 Chinese residents nationwide and possibly tens of thousands of mixed African/Chinese people in Jamaica).

== Mexico ==
=== History ===
The first Chinese immigrants to Mexico came from China, some were Philippine-born Chinese, brought by the Manila-Acapulco galleon trade. However most contemporary Chinese immigrants came to Mexico during the 20th century as contract workers and political refugees. With the rise of anti-Chinese sentiment in Mexico in the 1930s under President Plutarco Elías Calles, most Chinese Mexicans, including individuals of mixed Chinese and Mexican descent, were forced out of Mexico and deported to China.

=== Mexico City ===
Mexico City's small barrio chino is on Calle Dolores in Cuauhtémoc borough in the city center. The neighborhood Viaducto Piedad in the borough of Iztacalco also has a notable population of Chinese immigrants.

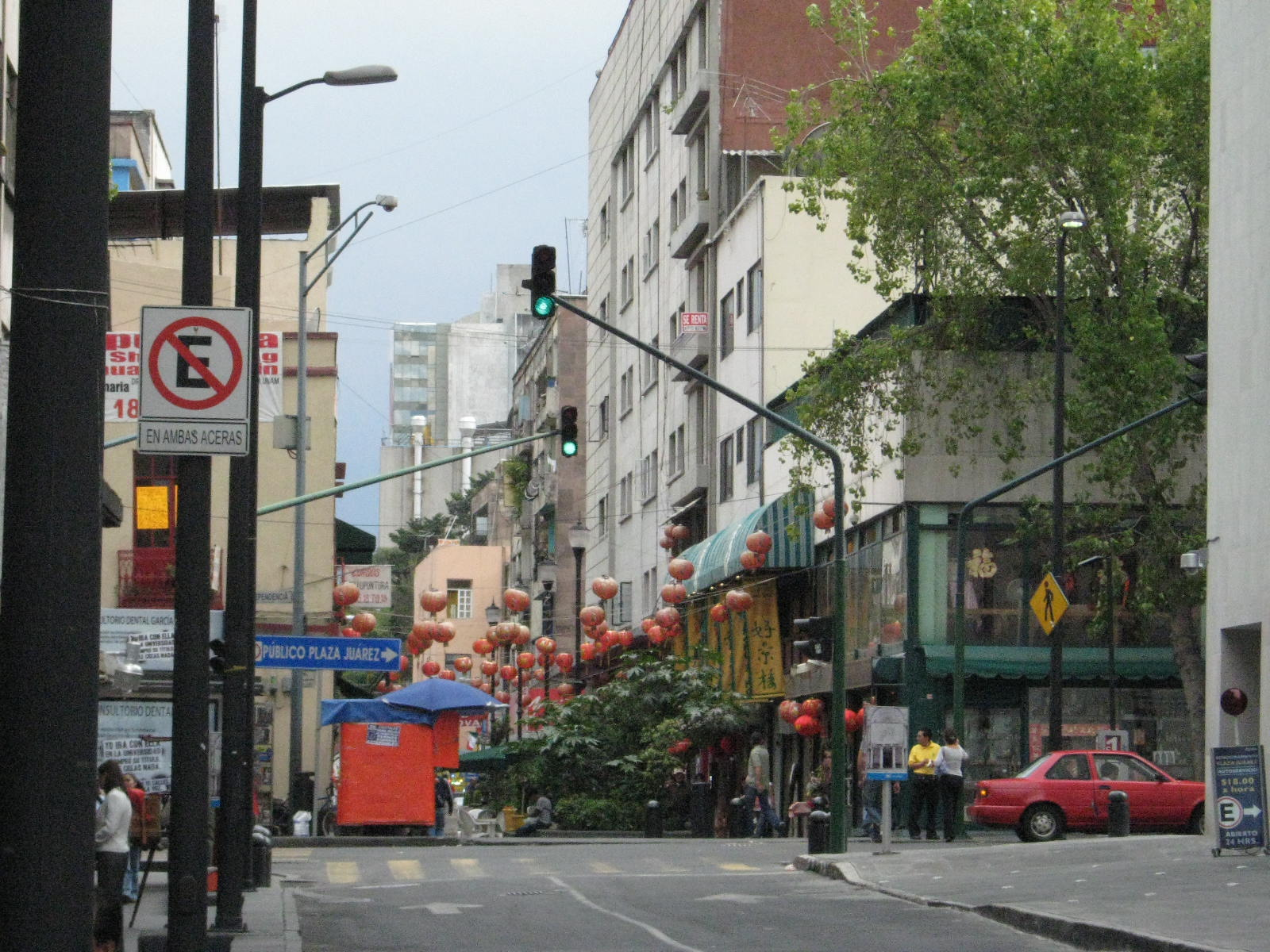
Entering Barrio Chino on Dolores Street.

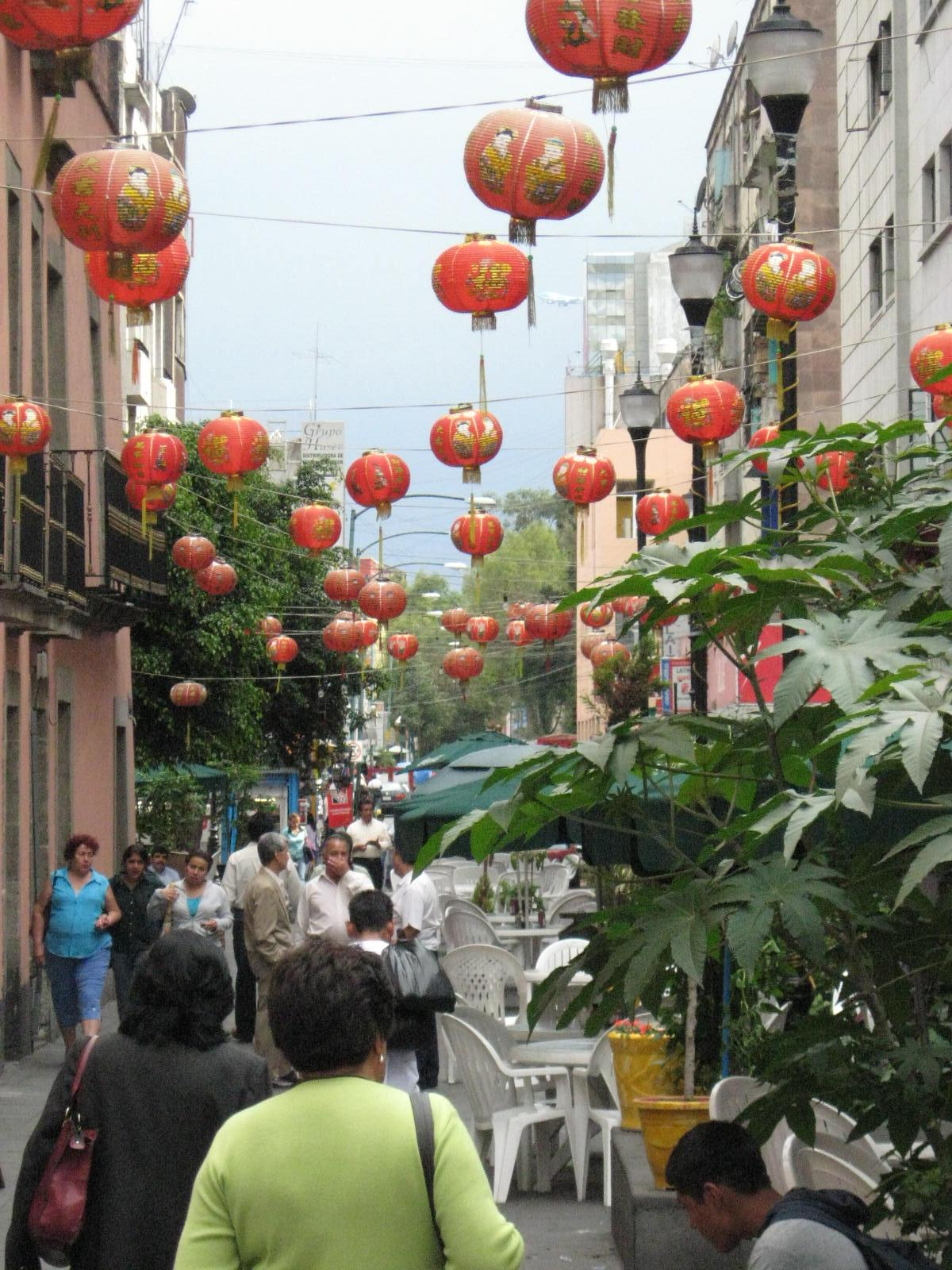
On Dolores Street in Barrio Chino.

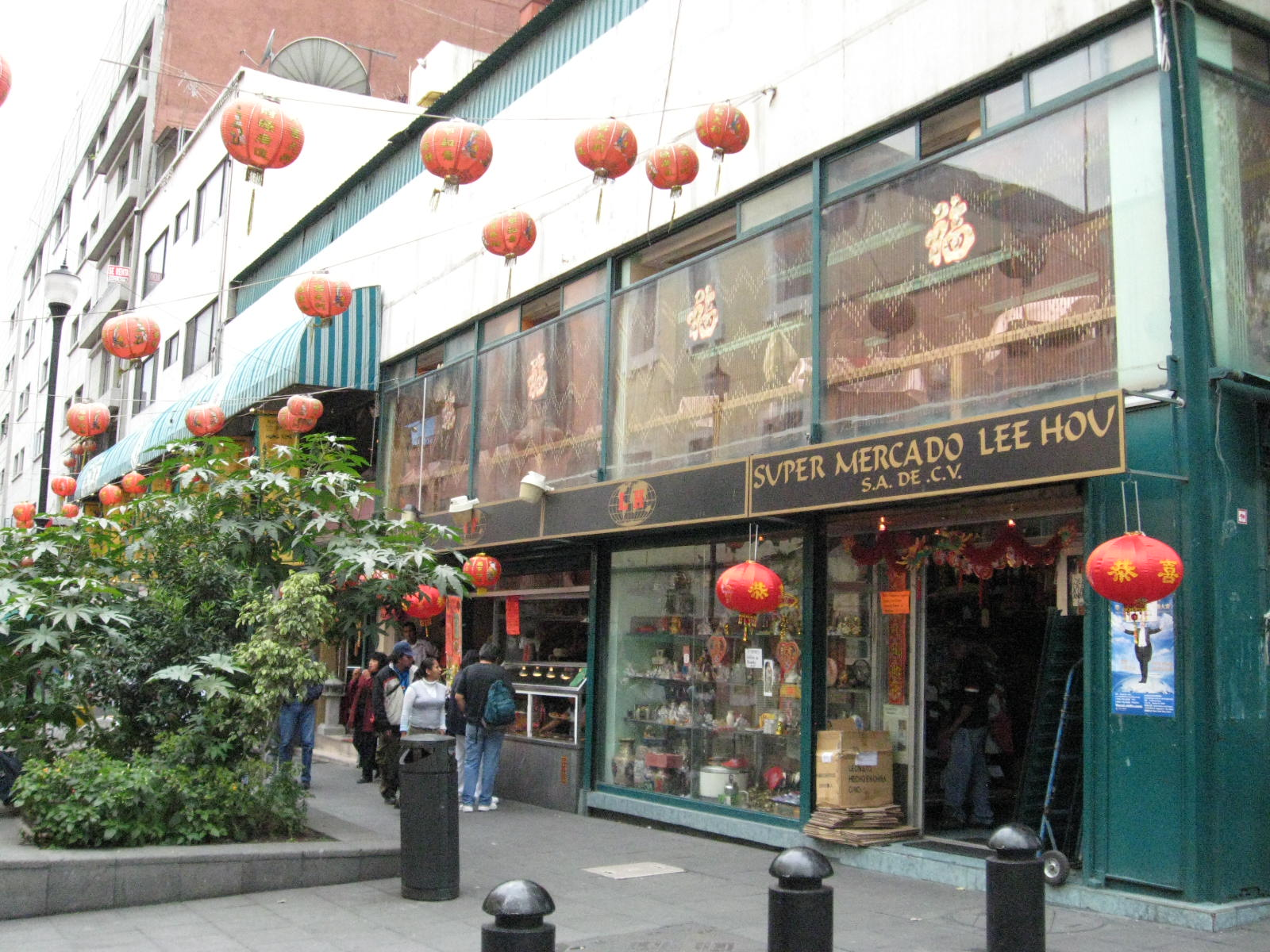
An Asian food supermarket on Dolores Street.

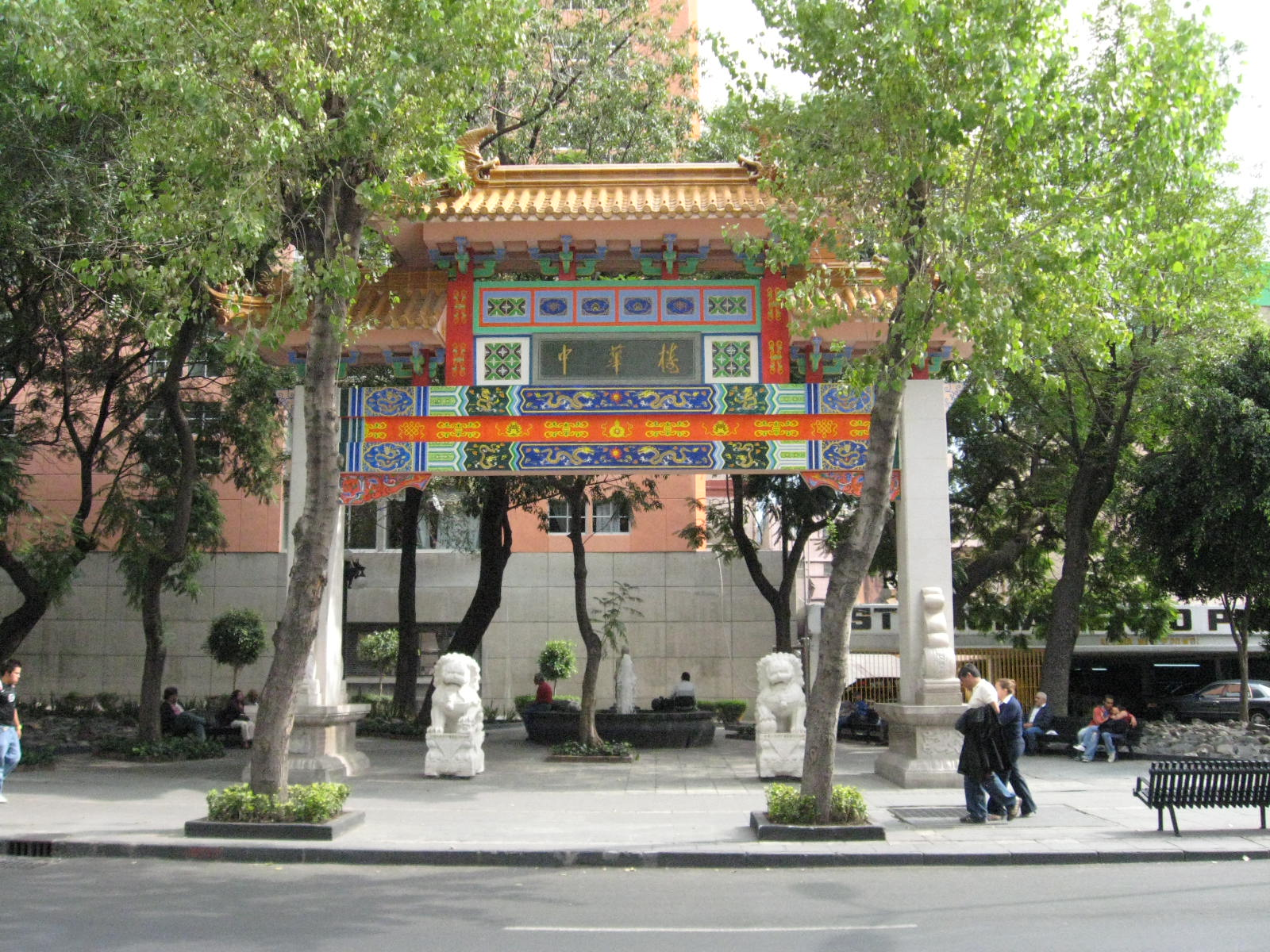
Arch in honor of the Chinese-Mexican community of Mexico City, built in 2008, located on Articulo 123 street

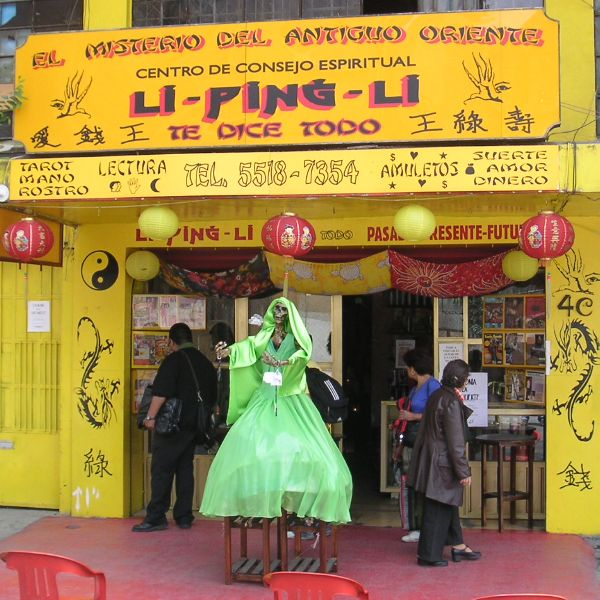
a store in Barrio Chino, Mexico City

=== Mexicali, a historic Chinese outpost ===
The border city of Mexicali, Baja California, contains the second largest concentration of Chinese Mexicans in Mexico. The neighborhood is located on Avenida Madero Calle Azueta, is called La Chinesca (The Chinesque one). Some of the earliest Chinese settlers who arrived in the United States eventually went south to Mexico to escape institutionalized anti-Chinese persecution in California. The largest number of new Cantonese-speaking Chinese immigrants came mostly from the Guangzhou area around 1919. Mexicali had a local chapter of the Kuomintang. There is now a consulate of the People's Republic of China in Mexicali as well as one in nearby Tijuana.

The economic problems of Mexico in the 1980s led many Chinese-Mexicans to migrate north into the United States. Today, members of the multi-generational Chinese-Mexican community own and operate many businesses across the city. One of the oldest Chinese restaurants, Restaurant 19, is named after one of the early Mexican Chinatown corridors, Alley 19, which opened December 18, 1928, and eventually closed in winter 2001. It was one of the oldest Chinese restaurants in Mexico. This restaurant was utilized by many U.S. and Mexican officials and celebrities throughout the years; its end eventually came due to the devaluation of the peso in the 1980s and the new border crossing that takes tourist and locals away from the original heart of Mexicali. Currently there are more than 80 Chinese restaurants from small coffee shops (cafés de chinos) to huge 750 occupancy dining rooms. Nowadays, there are about 2,000 Chinese Mexicans living in the city; however, there are 100,000 residents more than thought who are of Chinese descent.

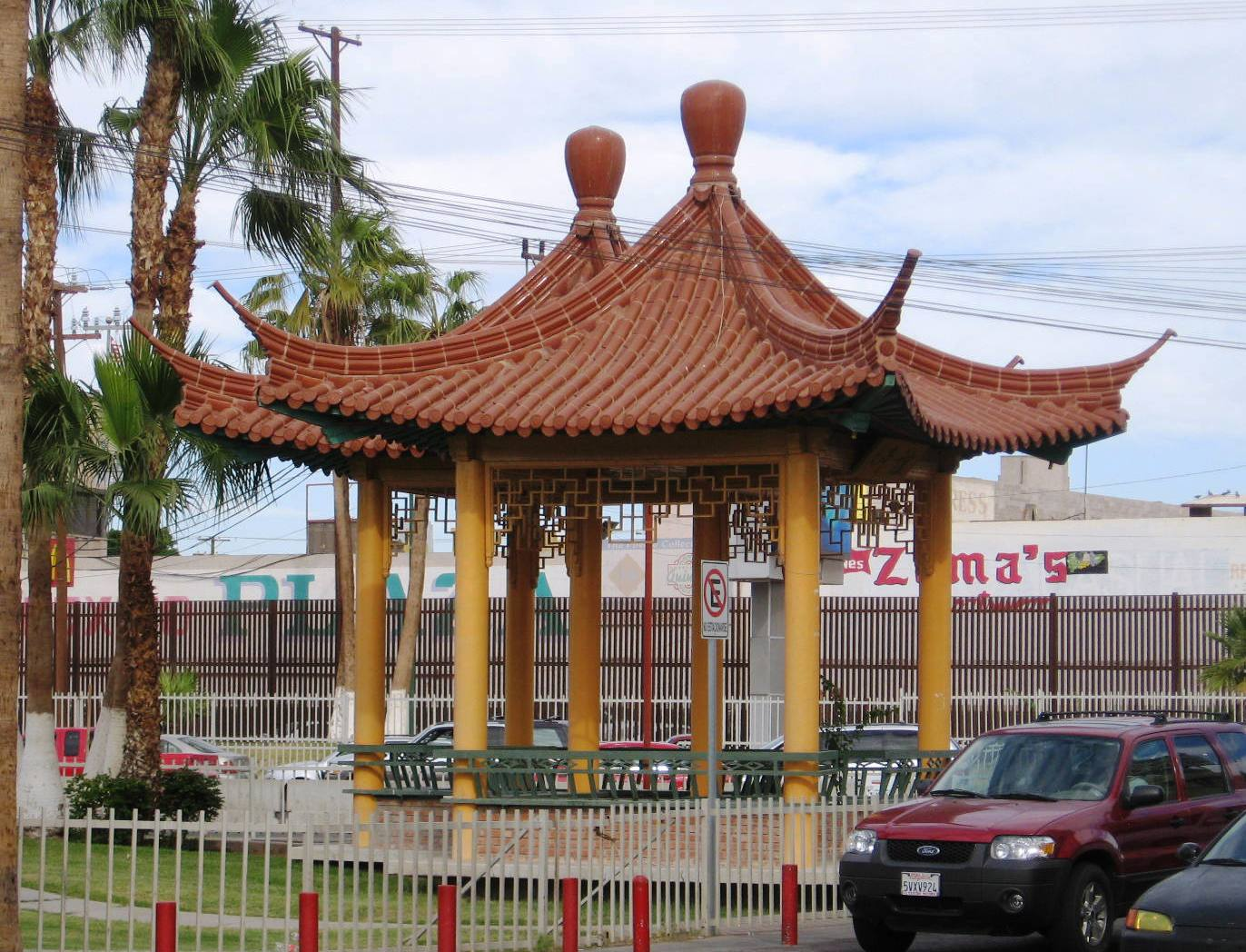
Plaza de la Amistad (Friendship Plaza) pagodas, located just outside the border crossing to the USA

=== Monterrey ===
After the USMCA was ratified, an industrial Chinatown with signs in both Spanish and Chinese formed in Monterrey to take advantage of tariff free trade with the United States given its proximity to Texas.

=== Tijuana ===
The Chinese enclave in the Mexican city of Tijuana is located in La Mesa. The enclave is home to 15,000 ethnic Chinese immigrants as of 2012, a number that has tripled from about 5,000 in 2009. The enclave is the second largest after the American enclave. The mayor of Tijuana Jorge Hank Rhon had received negative publicity from the local newspapers for his support for the official establishment of the Chinatown as there is general negative sentiment from locals who view China as a major rival for trade with the United States. There are various official events held during the summer recognizing the area in Tijuana's La Mesa District. Tijuana's Chinese community started around the late 1800s to the early 1900s when the Chinese immigrants to the United States fled California during a period called the "yellow peril". As Tijuana was a border town, it was an important city towards the establishment of the Mexicali Chinatown, where at the time, the Chinese community would outnumber Mexicans 2 to 1. Though the numbers were far fewer in Tijuana, thousands would come through Tijuana on their way to Ensenada and Mexicali, a journey usually by foot for 120 miles to the east. By the 1920s, the Chinese numbering around 15,000 would concentrate in Mexicali to avoid the Mexican civil war. Racism would keep the population small for many decades until the early 2000s when Aeromexico would first offer direct flights from Tijuana to Japan. In 2008, the airline would offer direct flights to Shanghai, making Tijuana the only Mexican city to offer such a route. The author has attributed the immigrant Chinese population rise to the direct flight, where there were 5,000 Chinese immigrants in 2009 and 15,000 by 2012. In 2012, the Chinese community started making the enclave known in 2012, whereas the community largely kept to itself in years prior. The Chinatown is one of the few recent Chinatowns that was not created from commercial ventures.

== Panama ==
The main Panamanian Chinatown is located in Panama City and is called the Barrio Chino, located in the neighborhood of San Felipe in the City of Panama. It consists of four Portals, beginning in Carlos A. Mendoza Street, covering Veraguas Street and part of the Eloy Alfaro and B Avenue. Most of the traditional Chinese shops are located in Carlos A. Mendoza Street, where you can find all kinds of shops, which range from food, articles for parties and events, Chinese curiosities and traditional Chinese food restaurants. There is also a part of Panama City named El Dorado with a mall that has the same name. It's full of Chinese and other Asiatic stores, restaurants and beauty shops. In the surrounding streets you can find Chinese casinos, churches and even a bank.

In Panama City the major Chinese New Year celebration is at "El Barrio Chino” in San Felipe but every Chinese community in other provinces has their own celebration.

== Peru ==
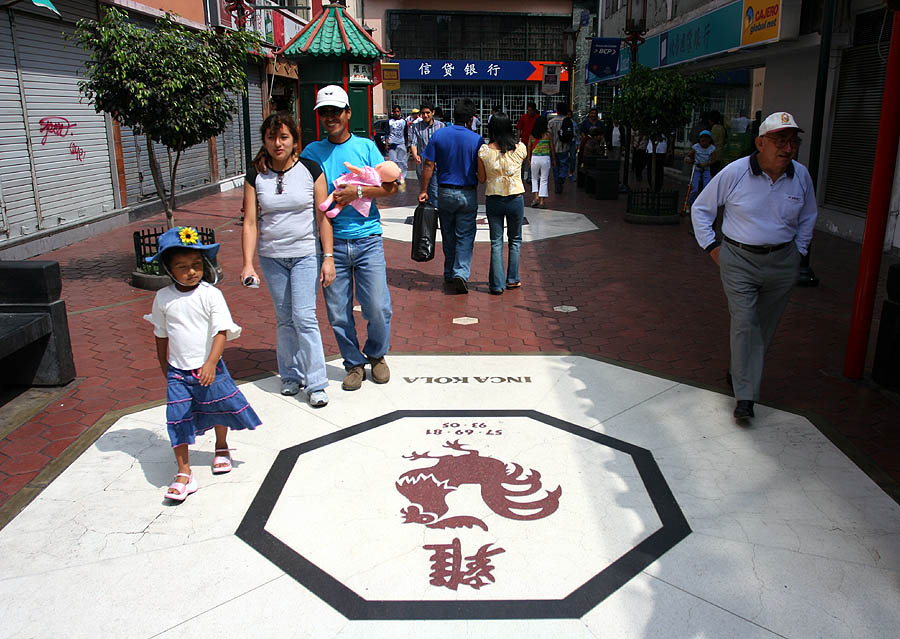
Chinatown in Lima

The main Peruvian Chinatown is located in Lima and is called the Barrio Chino, located on Calle Capón (Block 7 of Ucayali Street); it is one of the two earliest Chinatowns in the Western Hemisphere, and contains various notably Chinese architectural features.

Other Peruvian cities with notable Chinese-Peruvian populations include Chimbote, Trujillo, and Chiclayo, all on the north coast, where Chinese immigrants were brought to work on sugar cane plantations. Historical Chinese immigration to the Amazonian region of Peru may be documented in a small village intriguingly named "Chino" several miles outside of Iquitos.

== Trinidad and Tobago ==
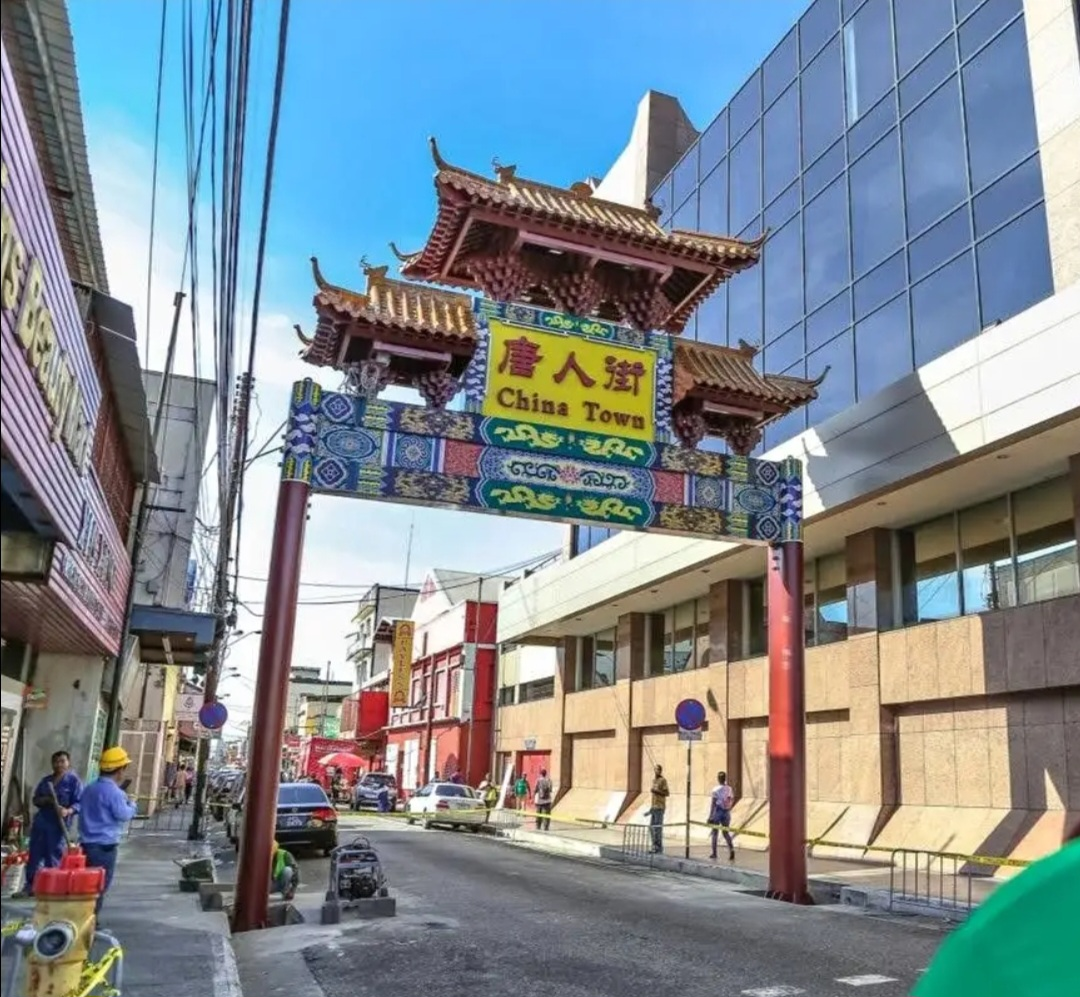
Chinatown arch at Charlotte Street

This country's capital, Port of Spain, has a Chinatown with an arch on Charlotte Street, which has Chinese businesses and merchants since 1970s.

== Venezuela ==
Venezuela is also home to one of Latin America's largest concentrations of ethnic Chinese. The city of Valencia, Carabobo home of the major Chinese community hosts various markets devoted to Chinese culture where can be found from smoked ducks to authentic pottery. A local newspaper is also edited in Chinese. A lively barrio chino also can be found on Avenida Principal El Bosque in the El Bosque district of Caracas.

Cantonese is widely spoken among Chinese Venezuelans, especially the variety commonly known as Hoisan or Toisan, but there has been recent Taiwanese immigration, adding to the linguistic and cultural diversity. Chinese from other places of the world also settled in Venezuela, especially from the Philippines, where they were experienced persecution in the 1970s under Ferdinand Marcos, and Cuba, where Fidel Castro's Communist Revolution seized their businesses.

== See also ==
- Chinese Caribbeans
- China–Latin America relations
- Chinatowns in the Americas
- Caribbean Chinese cuisine
- Puerto Rican Chinese cuisine
- Chinese Latin American cuisine
