= Asian Mexicans =

Ethnic group of Asian-descending Mexicans

Asian Mexicans Spanish: Mexicanos Asiáticos
Regions with significant populations
- Baja California, Bajío Region, Guerrero, Mexico City, Yucatan, Isthmus of Tehuantepec

Languages
- Mexican Spanish and Asian languages

Religion
- Christianity (mainly Catholicism), Mahayana Buddhism, Hinduism

Related ethnic groups
- Asian Latin Americans, Asian Americans

Asian Mexicans (Spanish: Mexicanos Asiáticos; Asiomexicanos) are Mexicans of Asian descent. Asians are considered cuarta raíz (fourth root) of Mexico in conjunction with the two main roots: Native and European, and the third African root.

Due to the historical and contemporary perception in Mexico of Asians as a distinct ethnic group in the country, this article focuses on Mexicans of South, East and Southeast Asian descent. For Mexicans of West Asian descent, see Arab Mexicans, history of the Jews in Mexico and Turks in Mexico.

== History ==
=== Colonial era ===
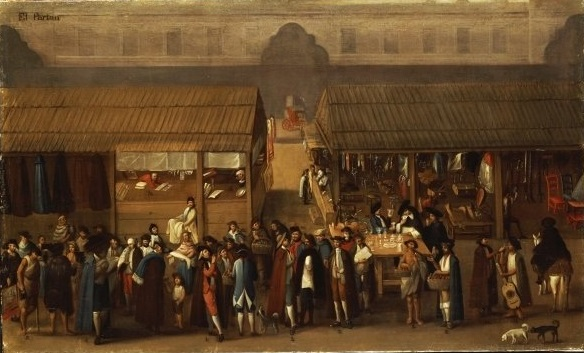
Depiction of the Parián market in Mexico City's Zócalo, c. 1770. In the colonial Philippines, parián districts were Chinese merchant neighborhoods and the name was given to important markets in colonial Mexico that sold the products brought by the Galleons.

The first record of an Asian in Mexico is from 1540; an enslaved cook originating from Calicut bought by Juan de Zumárraga in Spain and subsequently relocated to Mexico.

However, regular immigration did not begin until 1565 with the establishment of the Manila-Acapulco Galleon (lasting until 1815), which economically linked Asia, the Americas and Europe. During those two and a half centuries, many Filipinos, Mexicans and others sailed to and from Mexico and the Philippines; Mexicans as soldiers, governors and sailors, and Filipinos as slaves, prisoners and crew.

On these voyages, thousands of Asian individuals (mostly males) were brought to Mexico as slaves and were called chinos or indios chinos, which meant "Chinese" and "Chinese Indian", respectively. Although in reality they were of diverse origins, mostly Filipino, but also including slaves bought from the Portuguese or captured through war like the Moros (Muslim Filipinos), Malays, Javanese, Bengalis, and other ethnic groups in smaller numbers, including Japanese, Chinese, Sinhalese, Cambodians, Koreans and Timorese. This colonial grouping of Asians should not be confused with "chino", a casta term also used in New Spain to refer to individuals of mixed ancestry (primarily African and Amerindian).

During the early period of the Spanish colonization of the Philippines, Spaniards took advantage of the indigenous alipin (bonded serf) system in the Philippines to circumvent the Leyes de las Indias and acquire Filipino slaves for the voyage back to New Spain. Though the numbers are unknown, it was so prevalent that slaves brought on ships were restricted to one per person (except persons of rank) in the "Laws Regarding Navigation and Commerce" (1611–1635) to avoid exhausting ship provisions. They were also taxed heavily upon arrival in Acapulco in an effort to reduce slave traffic. Traffic in Filipina women as slaves, servants, and mistresses of government officials, crew, and passengers, also caused scandals in the 17th century. Women comprised around 20 percent of the migrants from the Philippines.

Filipinos were also pressed into service as sailors, due to the native maritime culture of the Philippine Islands. By 1619, the crew of the Manila galleons were composed almost entirely of native sailors. Many of whom died during the voyages due to harsh treatment and dangerous conditions. Many of the galleons were also old, overloaded, and poorly repaired. A law passed in 1608 restricted the gear of Filipino sailors to "ropa necesaria" which consisted of a single pair of breeches, further causing a great number of deaths of Filipino sailors through exposure. These conditions prompted King Philip III to sign a law in 1620 forcing merchants to issue proper clothing to native crews. During this period, many Filipino sailors deserted as soon as they reached Acapulco. Sebastian de Piñeda, the captain of the galleon Espiritu Santo complained to the king in 1619 that of the 75 Filipino crewmen aboard the ship, only 5 remained for the return voyage. The rest had deserted. These sailors settled in Mexico and married locals (even though some may have been previously married in the Philippines), particularly since they were also in high demand by wine-merchants in Colima for their skills in the production of tubâ (palm wine).

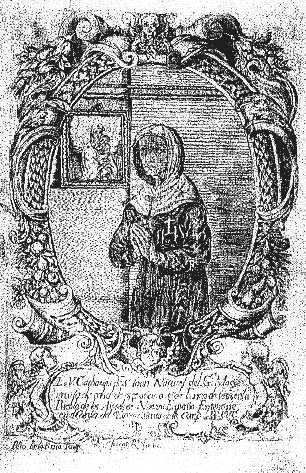
17th century depiction of Catarina de San Juan

A notable example of a chino slave is Catarina de San Juan (Mirra), an Indian girl captured by the Portuguese and sold into slavery in Manila. She arrived in New Spain, became well known for her religious piety and eventually became associated with the "China Poblana".

The estimate of the number of Asian immigrants during the Colonial era range from 40,000 to 120,000. By comparison, during the Colonial era, Mexico received about half a million Europeans and 250,000 Africans. These early Asian individuals, the foundation of the cuarta raíz, are not very apparent in modern Mexico for a few reasons: relatively small numbers, the widespread mestizaje (racial mixing) of Colonial Mexico and the common practice of chino slaves to "pass" as indios (the indigenous people of Mexico) in order to attain freedom. As had occurred with a large portion of Mexico's black population, over generations the Asian populace was absorbed into the general Mestizo population. The indigenous people were legally protected from chattel slavery, and by being recognized as part of this group, Asian slaves could claim they were wrongly enslaved.

Many Filipinos (both free and enslaved) worked on coconut plantations in the Southwest. There are examples of free Filipinos who held land, including Andrés Rosales who owned twenty-eight coconut palms in 1619. Asians were active in the politics of Colima; enough so that the position alcalde de los chinos (Mayor of the Chinos) was created.

In the years 1613 through 1620, several diplomatic missions occurred on behalf of Japan to the Vatican in Rome, traveling through New Spain (arriving in Acapulco and departing from Veracruz) and visiting various ports-of-call in Europe. Although the final destination was not Mexico, this mission is viewed as the beginning of Japan–Mexico relations. They were led by Hasekura Tsunenaga, who was accompanied by more than one hundred Japanese Christians as well as twenty-two samurai under the shōgun Hideyoshi Toyotomi. A fight occurred in 1614 in which a Japanese samurai stabbed a Spanish soldier. This was witnessed and recorded by historian Chimalpahin, who descended from an Aztec nobleman. Some of Tsunega's delegation would stay and marry with the locals.

A notable case of free Asians working in an urban setting is the 1635 conflict between chino and Spanish barbers in Mexico City. The legal case resulted in the expulsion of the Asians from the city center, limit on their numbers to twelve and prohibition on adopting Asian apprentices. Nonetheless, a 1667 document from the Real Audiencia details the attempt to limit the more than one hundred barber shops run by Asians without a license to twelve.

Some chinos (especially Filipinos who were Spanish subjects) held certain rights not afforded to most indigenous peoples (indios), such as carrying a sword/dagger or riding a horse. Examples exist of chinos proving their standing to authorities in order to carry arms; such as the 1654 case of Marcos de Villanueva, arguing that his people helped quell a sangley rebellion in Manila. Others argued that carrying arms were a necessity when traveling through remote areas with merchandise. The most privileged Asians were the samurai that remained in Mexico from the Japanese envoys.

=== After Independence ===
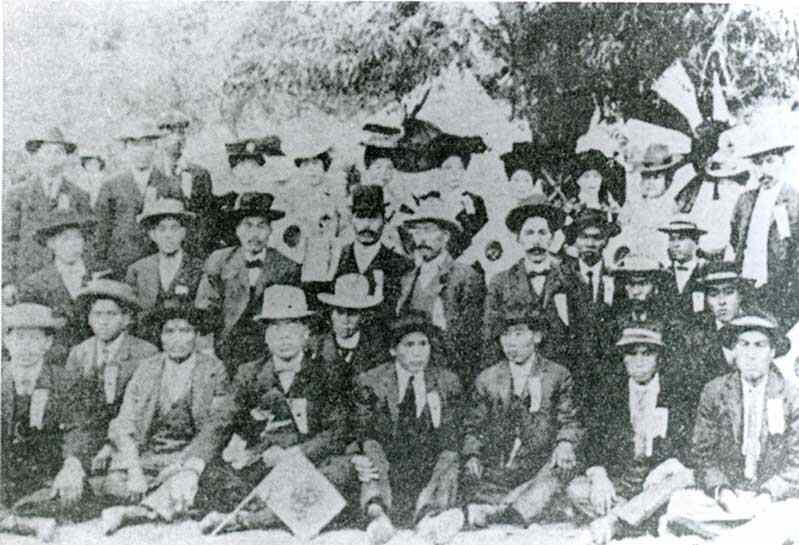
Japanese immigrant workers at the mine of Cananea, Sonora in the 1910s.

Japanese immigration began in earnest in 1888 after the signing of a treaty to allow citizens of both countries the ability to travel to the other and establishing consulates. Mexico was the first Latin American country to receive organized Japanese immigration in 1897, with the first thirty five arriving to Chiapas under the auspices of Viscount Enomoto Takeaki, with the permission of president Porfirio Díaz. The very first settlement was based on coffee production but failed for various reasons including the fact that not all of the colonists were farmers and many became sick with tropical diseases. Many from this colony dispersed but there remains a small Japanese community in Acacoyagua, Chiapas.

Modern Korean immigration to Mexico began in 1905. The first 1,033 Korean migrants settled in Yucatán as workers in henequen plantations.

Asians, predominantly Chinese, became Mexico's fastest-growing immigrant group from the 1880s to the 1920s, exploding from about 1,500 in 1895 to more than 20,000 in 1910. It was common among male Asian immigrants to quickly marry local women in order to facilitate assimilation. To do so, they were baptized into the Catholic faith, adopting a Christian name in the process. By doing this, they achieved a stronger bond with the land and a stronger sense of social belonging. They also received greater economic, moral and labor support from their new extended Mexican families.

At the same time, an anti-Chinese movement emerged during the Mexican Revolution and peaked during the Great Depression. This was in part due to resentment over the success of Chinese merchants and also fear of competition from Chinese workers willing to work for less pay. The most severe act of violence occurred in 1911. A massacre of over 300 Chinese in Torreón, Coahuila, which was carried out by a faction of Pancho Villa’s army. It culminated in mass deportations in the 1930s, when nearly 70% of the country's Chinese and Chinese-Mexican population was deported or otherwise expelled from the country.

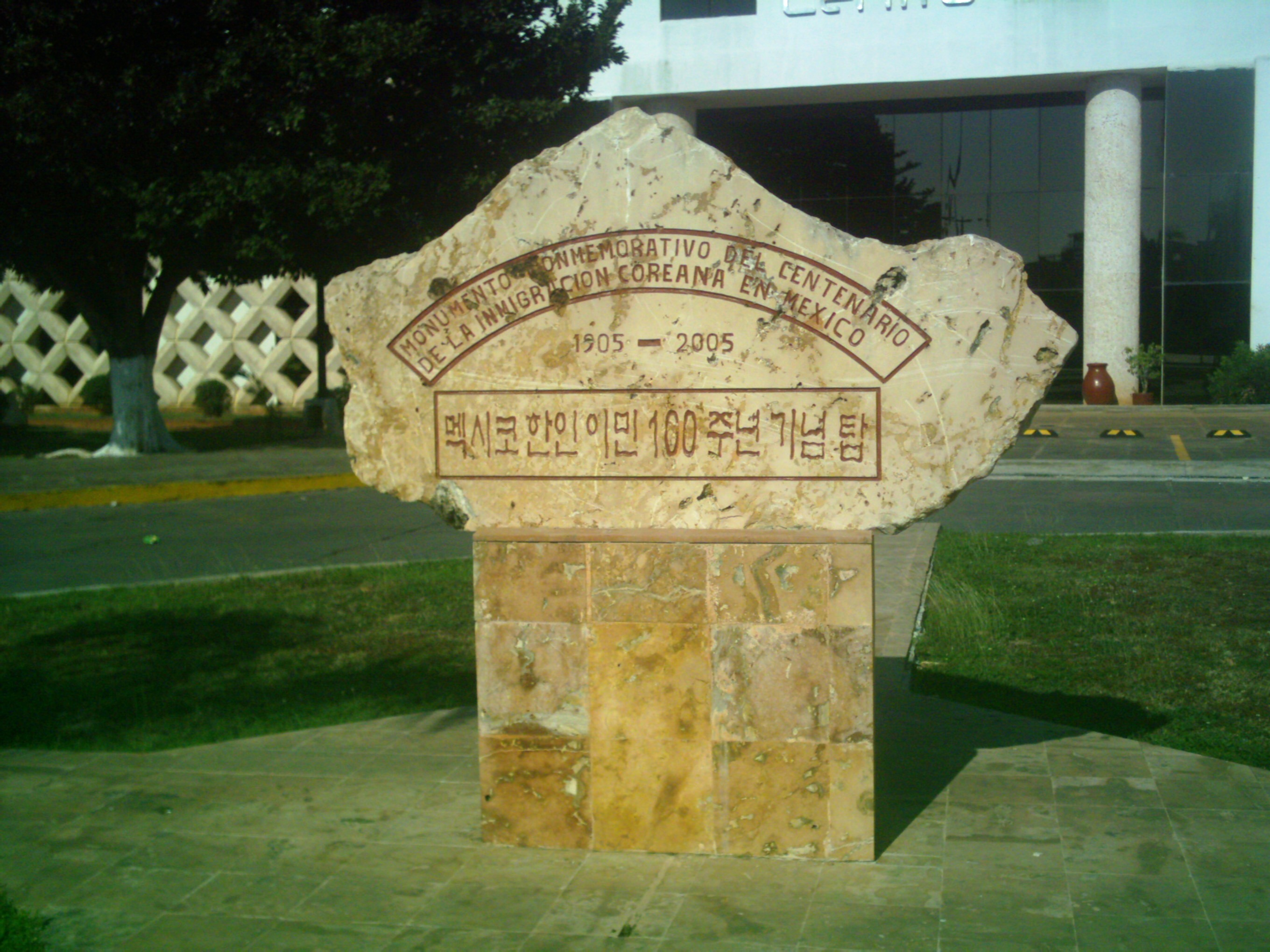
Monument in Mérida, Yucatan commemorating 100 years of Korean immigration (1905-2005)

Before World War II, the highest concentrations of Japanese and Japanese descent were in Baja California, followed by Mexico City and Sonora. Up until the war, the treatment of Japanese in the country and their descendants had been favorable, very different from the treatment of Chinese in the country. However, Japanese immigration was halted by WWII to near zero, and those who were in the country were faced with restrictions and relocation after Mexico broke diplomatic ties with Japan in 1941. Most Japanese citizens (especially the ones living in the Northwest) were forced to move to three interior cities: Celaya, Guadalajara and Mexico City. This was done so that they could not be used as a "fifth column" by the Japanese government. This treatment of ethnic Japanese is not in most accounts of Mexican history and is seldom taught in schools.

While in China, the Chinese-Mexicans that had been deported campaigned to be allowed to return to Mexico, from the 1930s to the 1960s. There was some success with two repatriations; one in the late 1930s and another in 1960.

After the end of the war, Japanese immigration to Mexico began again. From 1951 to 1978, this immigration was associated with Japan's economic growth, giving it money to invest abroad. A new smaller wave of Korean migrants also began to arrive in Mexico in the 1970s.

Larger numbers of Koreans began arriving in the 1990s: according to South Korean ment statistics, the size of the community reached its peak in 1997 with around 19,500 individuals before falling to 14,571 by 2005.

== Demographics ==
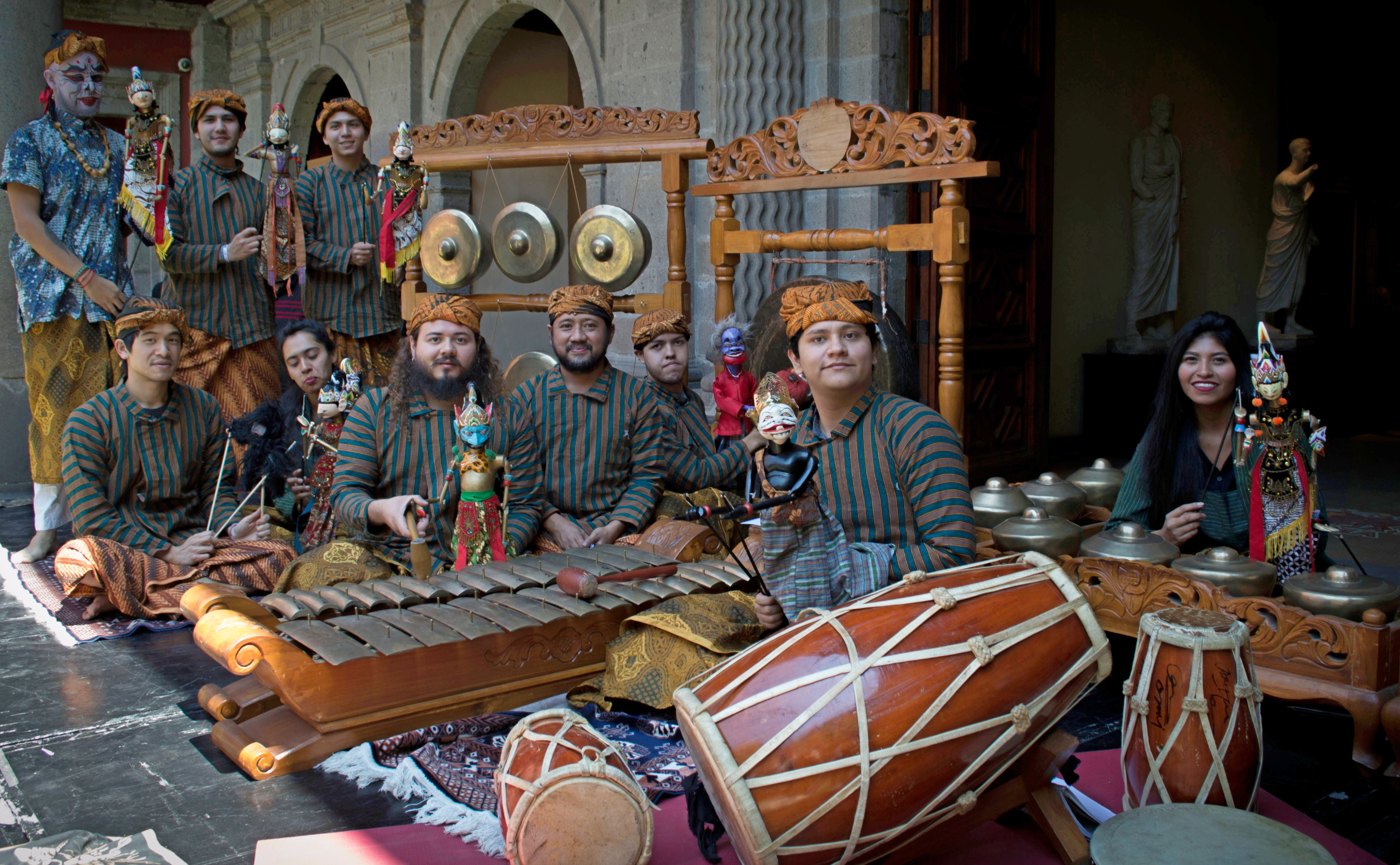
Indra Swara group performing at the Museo Nacional de las Culturas Mexico City 2018.

Of the 54,440 migrants granted permanent residency in 2013, 7,666 (14.08%) were Asian. 4,743 (8.71%) were Chinese, more than any other group except for Americans with 12,905 (23.7%).

According to the Indian Ministry of External Affairs, there are about 6,500 people of Indian descent living in Mexico as of December 2018, up from about 2,000 in March 2011.

According to the 2011 report of South Korea's Ministry of Foreign Affairs and Trade on overseas Korean populations, 11,800 overseas Koreans resided in Mexico. It is also claimed that the descendants of early henequen plantation laborers alone might number as many as thirty thousand.

In 1997, descendants of Japanese immigrants celebrated a century of Japanese immigration into Mexico, with an estimated 30,000 people of Japanese nationality or ethnicity living in Mexico.

As of 2008, there were about 70,000 people of Chinese descent living in Mexico.

Genomic studies indicate that about a third of people sampled from Guerrero have some Asian ancestry; with genetic markers matching those of the populations of Indonesia and the Philippines.

== Culture ==
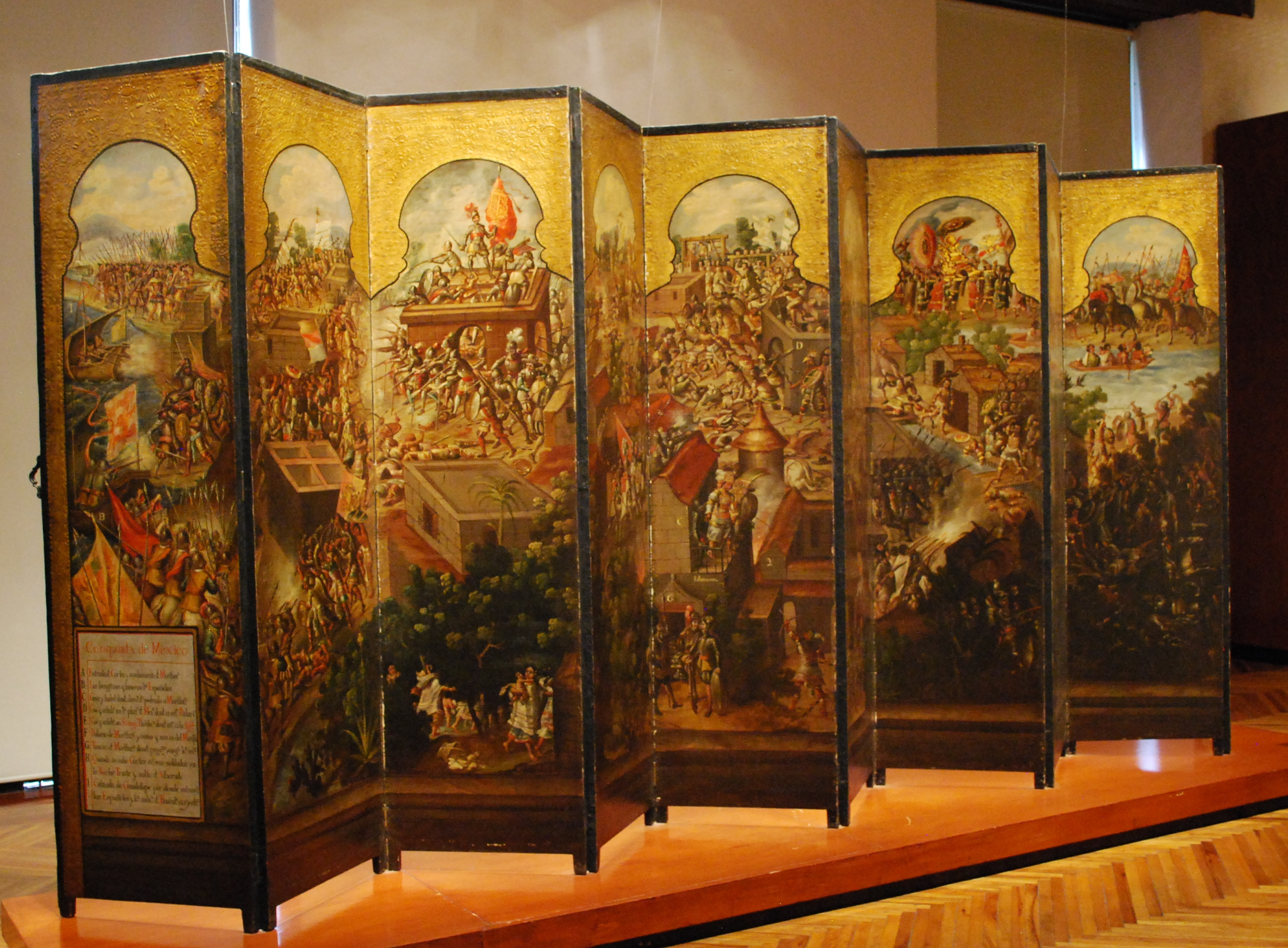
A 17th-century biombo (from Japanese byōbu) depicting the Conquest of Mexico. These folding screens first became popular in colonial Mexico following diplomatic contact, however most were produced in Mexico rather than imported from Japan.

The strongest Asian influence on the culture of Mexico happened during the colonial era, many aspects of which modern Mexicans may not be aware of. Notable Filipino contributions during this era include tubâ (palm wine) and possibly the guayabera (from the barong tagalog). Filipino words also entered Mexican vernacular, such as the word for palapa (originally meaning "coconut palm leaf petiole" in Tagalog), which became applied to a type of thatching using coconut leaves that resembles the Filipino nipa hut.

Asian influence during the colonial era can probably best be seen in the art of Mexico. Among the various luxury goods that arrived on the Manila Galleons were lacquerware, porcelains and folding screens. These items were meant for the New Spanish elite, but as these goods, especially textiles, became more common, they reached the masses. Chinese porcelain, especially the kind showing blue decoration on white, had an important effect on Mexican ceramics. The ceramic industry in Puebla included decorative elements like the phoenix, peonies, chrysanthemums, pagodas and willows. Chinese artisans, and probably some Japanese, participated in the manufacturing of talavera. Folding screens were introduced from Japan, with Mexican-style ones produced called biombos. The earliest of these Mexican made screens had Asian designs but later ones had European and Mexican themes. As well as the Asian-influenced artworks known as enconchados, paintings that incorporated mother-of-pearl.

The majority of the cargo on the Galleons were textiles which also had a profound influence on the textiles of Mexico; such as the paliacate and the change of material/decorative motifs of rebozos. The lacquerware of Michoacan and Guerrero traces its origins to pre-Hispanic indigenous traditions and was heavily influenced by the cargo and artisans that were brought by the Galleons. The "pajaritos de la suerte", a common street performance in Mexico where a bird randomly chooses a fortune for the spectator may have Asian origins, possible sources include omikuji and a similar tradition from China existing since at least the 19th century. Chamoy is a variety of savory sauce and condiment; although the attribution for its introduction to Mexico is uncertain, it descends from the Chinese crack seed (西梅, xī méi).

=== Filipinos ===
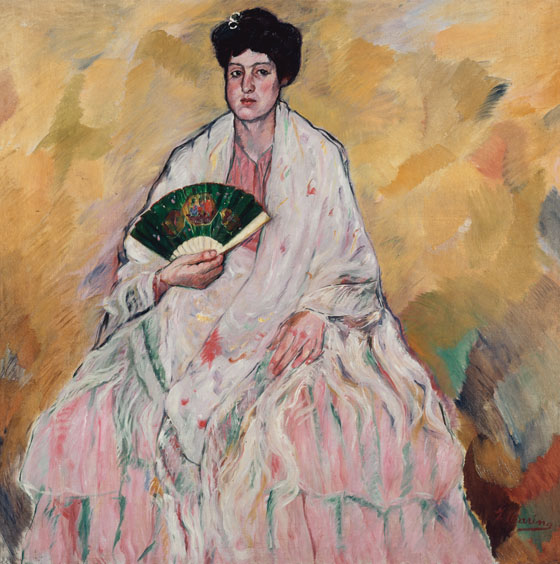
The mantón de Manila were originally inspired by the Filipino pañuelo, both also influenced the later designs of the rebozo

Filipinos introduced many cultural practices to Mexico, such as the method of making palm wine, called "tubâ", and the distillation technology used to make mezcal. A genetic study in 2018 found that around a third of the population of Guerrero have 10% Filipino ancestry. Christianized Filipinos comprised the majority of free Asian immigrants (chino libre) and could own property and have rights that even Native Americans did not have, including the right to carry a sword and dagger for personal protection. It is estimated that around 75,000 Filipinos settled in western Mexico during the colonial era. They intermarried with local mixed-race and indigenous Mexican families who also had Spanish surnames, were Catholic, and were similarly dark-complexioned.

The loss of cultural identity of early Filipino migrants to Mexico is the result of several factors. The most significant factor being the use of the terms indio and chino. In the Philippines, natives were known as indios, but they lost that classification when they reached the Americas, since the term in New Spain referred to Native Americans. Instead they were called chinos, leading to the modern confusion of early Filipino immigrants with the much later Chinese immigrants in the late 1800s and early 1900s.

Another factor is the pre-colonial Filipino (and Southeast Asian) tradition of not having last names. Filipinos and Filipino migrants acquired Spanish surnames, either after conversion to Christianity or enforced by the Catálogo alfabético de apellidos during the mid-19th century. This makes it very difficult to trace Filipino immigrants in colonial records.

Filipinos mostly settled in the regions near the terminal ports of the Manila galleons. These include Acapulco, Barra de Navidad, and San Blas, Nayarit, as well as numerous smaller intermediate settlements along the way. They also settled the regions of Colima and Jalisco before the 17th century, which were seriously depopulated of Native American settlements during that period due to the Cocoliztli epidemics and Spanish forced labor. They also settled in significant numbers in the barrio San Juan of Mexico City, although in modern times, the area has become more associated with later Chinese migrants.

=== Chinese ===
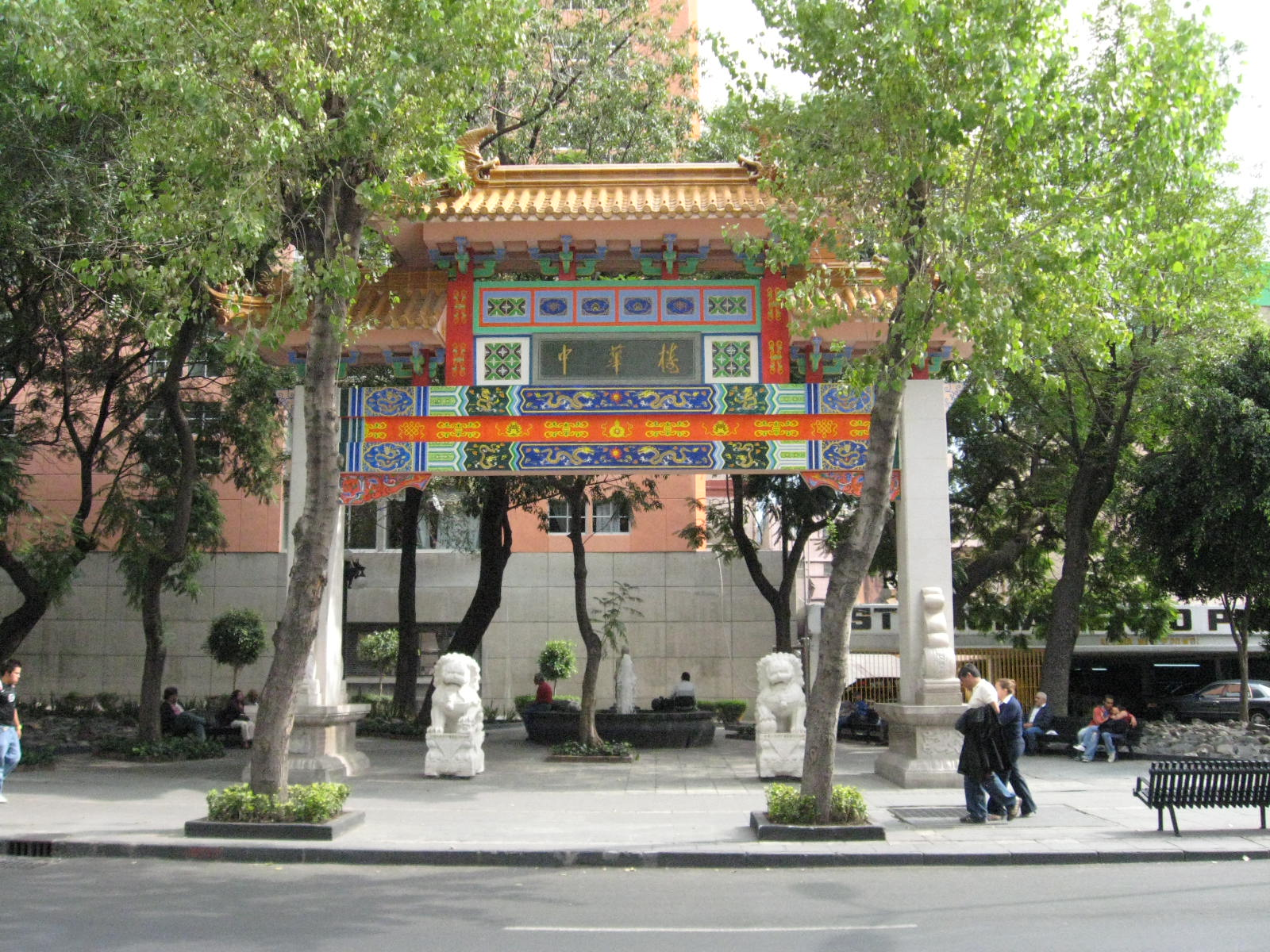
The Paifang in Mexico City's Barrio Chino

There are two major Chinese communities or "Chinatowns" in Mexico today: La Chinesca in Mexicali and the Barrio Chino in Mexico City. Mexicali still has more Chinese, mostly Cantonese, restaurants per capita than any other city in Mexico, with over a thousand in the city. The Comunidad China de México, A.C., established in 1980, sponsors Chinese festivals, classes and other activities to preserve and promote Chinese-Mexican culture in Mexico City.

Café de chinos, which became popular in 20th century Mexico City, were run by Chinese Mexicans and offered an assortment of local and mixed cuisine .

=== Japanese ===
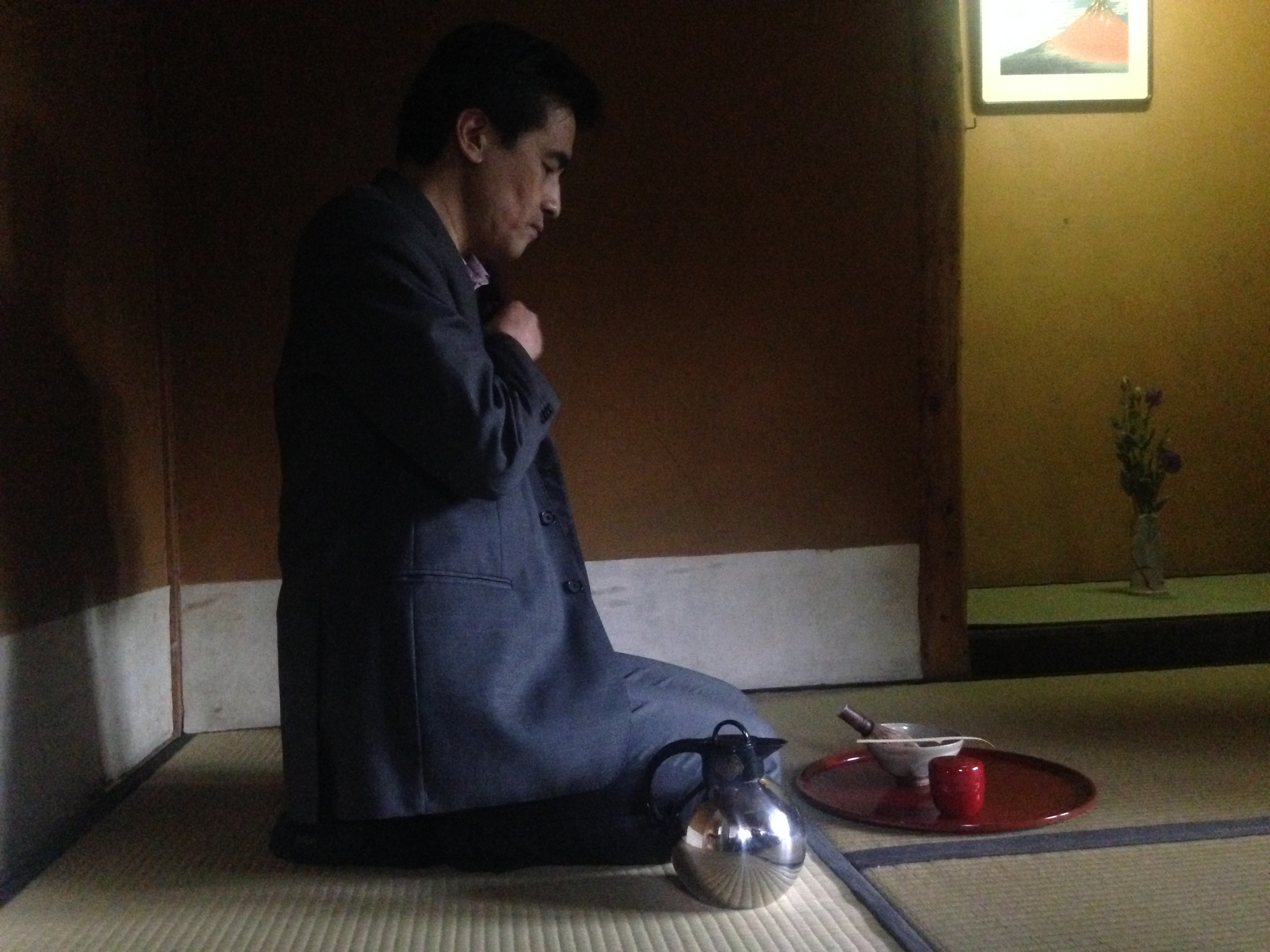
Japanese tea ceremony in Mexico City

Most Japanese immigrants came from Okinawa, Fukuoka, Hiroshima, Aichi, and Miyagi prefectures. The Liceo Mexicano Japonés in Mexico City was founded, in part, to preserve Japanese culture. There has been a notable influx of young Japanese artists into Mexico since 1978, who have settled mostly in Mexico City. They have come because they have found it easier to develop their careers in Mexico, as the art market in Japan is very small and very hard to break into. Cacahuates japoneses (lit. Japanese peanuts) are a popular snack in Mexico and were created by Japanese immigrant Yoshigei Nakatani (father of artist Carlos Nakatani) in 1945.

The majority of the Japanese Mexican community (some 90%) is Roman Catholic. Every year since 1949, hundreds of members of the community make the pilgrimage to visit the Virgen de Guadalupe in kimono.

=== Korean ===
Mexico City's Zona Rosa district has a Koreatown dubbed Pequeño Seúl (Little Seoul), filled with businesses established by new migrants. In the same neighborhood, the Escuela Coreana en México, found its home in 2010 after two decades of occupying a variety of rented facilities. That year it was able to acquire its own premises thanks to US$850,000 donations by companies and other benefactors to the Asociación de Residentes Coreanos en México.

Taekwondo was introduced to Mexico in 1969 by Dai-won Moon. With over 1.5 million taekwondo practitioners and 3,500 schools throughout the country, taekwondo is one of the most popular sports in the nation. Mexico has medaled in taekwondo at all Olympic Games since it became a full medal sport at the 2000 Olympics, and currently places fifth overall on the medal count for the sport.

== Notable individuals ==
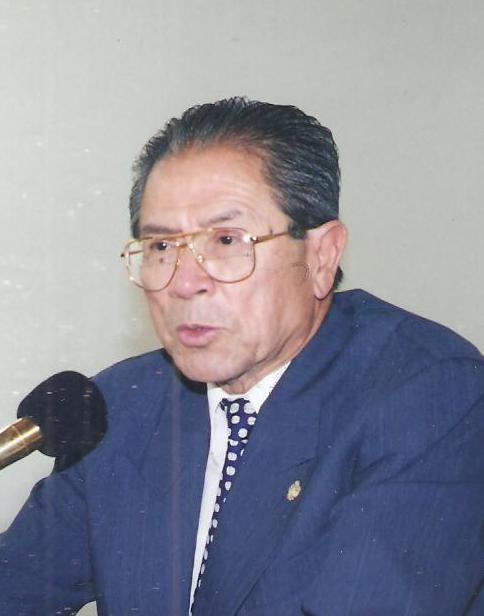
Under Dr. Jesús Kumate Rodríguez, the Secretariat of Health oversaw the implementation of universal vaccination, the eradication of poliomyelitis and a sharp decrease in infant mortality.

- Ana Gabriel – Chinese Mexican – Singer
- Carlos Kasuga – Japanese Mexican – Businessman
- Jesús Kumate Rodríguez – Japanese Mexican – Physician; former Secretary of Health
- Pablo Larios Iwasaki – Japanese Mexican – Footballer
- Lyn May – Chinese Mexican – Entertainer
- Luis Nishizawa – Japanese Mexican – Painter
- Miguel Ángel Osorio Chong – Chinese Mexican – Former Secretary of the Interior
- Sanjaya Rajaram – Indian Mexican – Agronomist; creator of 480 types of wheat
- Zhenli Ye Gon – Chinese Mexican – Businessman; alleged drug trafficker

== See also ==
- Japanese community of Mexico City
- The Chinese in Mexico
