= Jesús González Rubio =

Jesús González Rubio (died April 26, 1874) was a professor of music in Guadalajara, Mexico, who is best known for having composed the Jarabe Tapatío, also known in the United States as the "Mexican Hat Dance".

He established his own private school in Guadalajara for talented young musicians in the early 19th century, among them, Clemente Aguirre (1828-1900), who subsequently also became a noted music instructor and composer who influenced later musicians.

Gonzalez-Rubio died on April 26, 1874, in Guadalajara. His remains were interred at the Templo de San Francisco de Asis.
