= Clemente Aguirre =

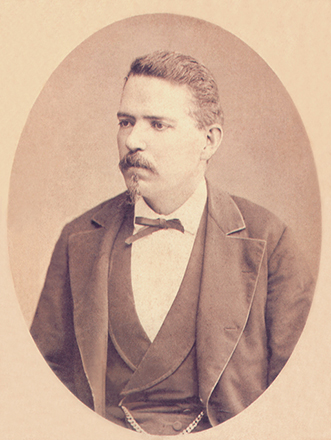

Background information
- Born: November 23, 1828
- Died: October 24, 1900 (aged 71)
- Occupations: composer and music instructor

Clemente Aguirre (November 23, 1828 – October 24, 1900) was a Mexican composer, conductor, bandleader, instructor, and folksong collector active in Guadalajara, Jalisco. His father died when he was a child, leaving his family in poverty. Nonetheless, when he was 11, he was accepted to study music with Professor Jesús González Rubio, composer of the well-known Jarabe tapatío ("Mexican Hat Dance").

By 1858 he had founded and directed the leading orchestra in Jalisco. He later joined the Sociedad Filarmónica in Jalisco.

In 1958, he was honored with a statue in Guadalajara's Rotonda de los Jaliscienses Ilustres.

== See also ==
- Statue of Clemente Aguirre
