= Bobble =

Bobble may refer to:

- Bobble, a stasis field in science fiction
- Bobble (knitting), a form of stitching in knitting
- Bobble (textile) or pill, small round pieces of fabric that form on natural fabrics through use
- Bobble hat, a knit beanie hat with a "bobble" (pom pom) at the top
- Bobblehead, a doll that moves or "bobbles" its head
- A hair tie, particularly in English
