= Catarina de San Juan =

Asian-born slave and saint (1607–1688)

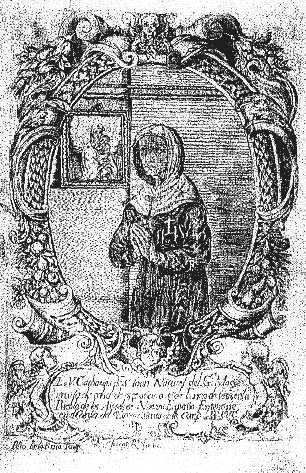
Catarina de San Juan, in a 17th-century woodcut

Catarina de San Juan (c. 1607 – 5 January 1688), known as the China Poblana, was an India-born woman who was enslaved and brought to New Spain via the Spanish East Indies and later became revered as a saint in Mexico. Her true origin is unclear, but according to legend her original name was Mirra and she belonged to a noble family from India. She was allegedly kidnapped by Portuguese pirates and sold in the Philippines as a slave, converting to Catholicism and adopting the Christian name Catarina de San Juan. She was then transported across the Pacific Ocean to Spanish Mexico, where she continued to work as a slave, married, and eventually became a beata – an ascetic woman or anchorite who adheres to personal religious vows without entering a convent – in Puebla de Zaragoza. Upon her death in 1688, Catarina de San Juan was buried in the sacristy of the Jesuit Templo de la Compañía de Jesús in Puebla, in what is popularly known as Tumba de la China Poblana. (Note: In Hispanic cultures at the time it was common to use the term chino to refer to all persons of Asian descent, regardless of actual ethnicity.)

== History ==
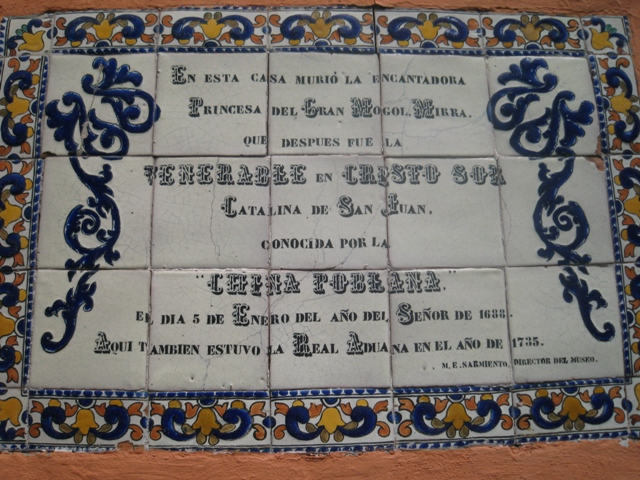
Pottery sign at the house of Catarina de San Juan in Puebla

Everything that is known about the life of Catarina de San Juan is from a handful of texts published in the 17th century. One is a transcript of the sermon preached at her funeral by Jesuit Francisco de Aguilera, and two others were written by her confessors: Alonso Ramos, who wrote a three-volume life of Catarina, and a parish priest, José del Castillo Grajeda, who wrote hagiographies of her life at the request of Diego Carrillo de Mendoza y Pimentel, Marquis of Gélves and Viceroy of New Spain. Ramos's three-volume life of Catarina is by one scholar's account the lengthiest Spanish text to have been published during the colonial era.

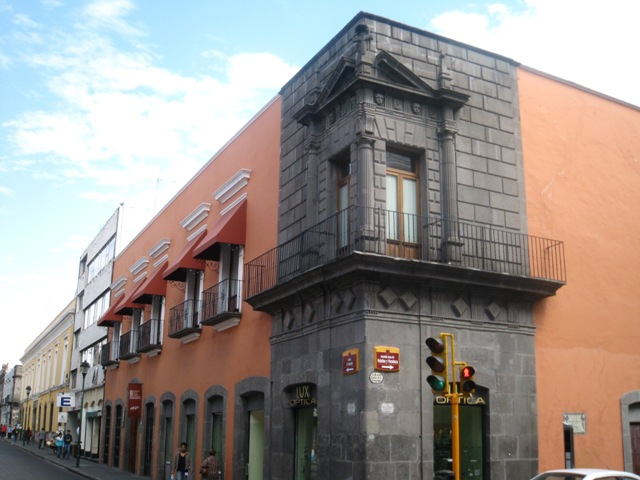
House of Catalina de San Juan in Puebla

These accounts of her life are likely exaggerated, however, and have been extensively studied by modern scholars not so much as texts narrating history but as an example of how colonial hagiographers constructed narratives of a holy person's life (vida). Nonetheless, they remain the only available contemporary sources regarding Catarina's life.

According to these sources, a young Indian woman was brought from the Philippines (Note: Since the times of its pre-colonial kingdoms, the Philippines had been a trading hub and crossroads for East, Southeast (mainland and maritime), and even South Asia. This accumulation and diffusion of goods, people, and ideas continued into the Spanish colonial era.) by merchant ship to be the viceroy's personal servant. This girl, named Mirra, had been kidnapped by Portuguese pirates and taken to Cochin (modern-day Kochi) in the south of India. There, she escaped her kidnappers and took refuge in a Jesuit mission, where she was baptized with the name Catarina de San Juan. Mirra was then delivered to Manila, where she was purchased as a slave by a merchant who later took her to New Spain. But once they disembarked in the port of Acapulco, instead of delivering her to the Marquis, the merchant sold her as a slave to a Pueblan man, Miguel de Sosa, for ten times the price that the viceroy had promised for her.

A few years after her arrival in Mexico, Miguel de Sosa died, providing in his will for the manumission of his slave. Catarina was briefly married to a slave of the chino caste named Domingo Juárez. After his death, she was taken in by a convent, where it is said she began to have visions of the Virgin Mary and Baby Jesus.

Catarina de San Juan, or Mirra (or Mira/Meera), followed the style of dress of her birth country, India, completely wrapped in a sari that covered her whole body. She may also have worn the langa voni, which consists of a blouse and a petticoat. It is possible that this mode of dress influenced the china dress, a traditional style of dress worn by Mexican women until the late 19th century, though there is no primary source evidence supporting this assertion.

Catarina de San Juan died 5 January 1688, at the age of 82 years. In Puebla de los Ángeles she was venerated as a popular saint until 1691, when the Holy Inquisition prohibited open devotion to her. Today, the former Jesuit church, the Templo de la Compañía, in Puebla, is known as La Tumba de la China Poblana because in its sacristy purportedly lie the remains of Catarina de San Juan.
