= La Raspa =

Mexican dance

La Raspa is a Mexican dance often performed during celebrations and at dance schools. Originating in Veracruz, the name may be derived from the Old Germanic verb "raspere", meaning "to grate upon". It either referred to the way the ratchet-like sound of the Güiro is produced by rubbing a scraper over its indentations or to the scratching movements – similar to a scraping chicken – the dancers perform during the folk dance. The Mexican Hat Dance is a combination of two tunes: Jarabe Tapatío and La Raspa.
