= China poblana =

Traditional women's dress of Mexico

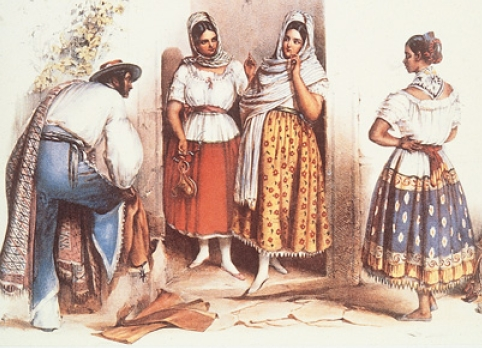
Poblanas (women of Puebla), in a 19th-century vignette. To the left appears a chinaco.

China poblana (lit. Chinese woman from Puebla) is considered the traditional style of dress of women in Mexico, although in reality it only belonged to some urban zones in the middle and southeast of the country, before its disappearance in the second half of the 19th century. Poblanas are women of Puebla.

== Fashion design of the china dress ==
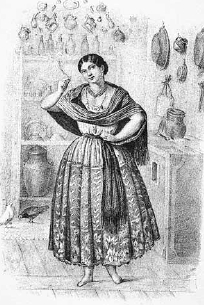
"La china" woman, in a lithograph that accompanied the heading of the same name in the book Los mexicanos pintados por sí mismos about Mexican culture.

¡Plaza!, que allá va la nata y la espuma de la gente de bronce, la perla de los barrios, el alma de los fandangos, la gloria y ambición de la gente de "sarape y montecristo", la que me subleva y me alarma, y me descoyunta y me... (The plaza!—filled with the cream and the dregs of the bronzed people, the pearl of the neighborhoods, the soul of the fandangos, the glory and ambition of the people of "sarape and montecristo", that which stirs and alarms me, and disjoints me, and...)

— La china. José María Rivera.

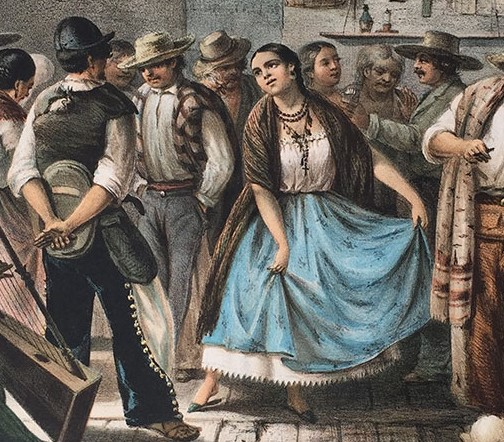
A Mexican fandango from the 19th century. In the image a china woman can be seen dancing with her characteristic fine attire, to the sound of a harp.

The fashion design of the china poblana dress is attributed to Catarina de San Juan, although it certainly incorporates elements from the diverse cultures that were mixed in New Spain during three centuries of Spanish rule.

According to descriptions written in the 19th century, the era in which the dress was very popular in various cities in the middle and southeast of Mexico, china outfit is made up of the following garments:

- A white blouse, with fringing and embroidery of silk and beads, in geometric and floral designs in bright colors. The blouse was sufficiently low-cut to allow part of the neck and the bosom to be seen, which scandalized to no end the "proper" women of nineteenth century Mexican society.
- A skirt called castor (or, "beaver"), named after the material it was made from. According to some historians, castor was used by well-heeled ladies of the household to make the underskirts of their indigenous maids. The castor skirt was decorated with sequins and camarones (literally, shrimp) that formed geometric and floral shapes. Folkloric dance groups have revived a version that has the coat of arms of Mexico embroidered with sequins, beads, and bugles (a type of bead).
- A white slip with enchilada stitching, that is to say with the lower hem criss-crossed with zig-zagged lacework. The slip of a china poblana would peek out under the castor skirt, and served to keep the form of a woman attired in the china dress from showing in silhouette.
- A loop that held up the castor and the slip to the waist of the woman who wore it. The loop may or may not have been adorned with embroidery, or woven in brocade-style.
- A shawl, sometimes made fine with silk, or in most cases with bobbles. The shawl is a very common garment in Mexico, even today. Women use it to cover themselves from the cold, but it was also used to carry babies or any other thing that was difficult to carry barehanded due to size and weight. The bobble shawl, which was most commonly used in china dresses, was woven with threads of blue and white color, and originated in the Otomí town of Santa María del Río (San Luis Potosí).
- In some instances, the china was accompanied with a scarf or kerchief of silk to hide any cleavage that might peek out of the blouse. Of these scarves, José María Rivera wrote that "these regularly come home on Sunday only to return to the pawn shop on Monday or Tuesday".
- As footwear, 19th century author Manuel Payno pointed out that despite her financial lackings, a china-dress woman would use satin shoes embroidered with silk thread. This type of footwear appears in some nineteenth century Mexican texts as an indicator that the wearer was a "merry woman". Furthermore, the china wearer completed the outfit with beads and jewels that adorned her ears, her cleavage, and her hands.

== Cultural representations of la china ==
Eso sí que no; yo soy la tierra que todos pisan, pero no sé hacer capirotadas.

(It is so that it is not so; I am the ground that everyone walks on, but I don't know how to make bread pudding.)

— La china. José María Rivera.

Nineteenth-century descriptions of women wearing the china paint them as simultaneously attractive and too risque for the times. Men saw these women as beautiful for their brown complexion, their "plump" but not "fat" body and face, and, most significantly, their differences from women of higher social strata in their lack of artifices to enhance their beauty. Author José María Rivera notes that if a china woman would have seen a corset, she would have thought it a torture device such as used on Saint Ursula and the Eleven Thousand Virgins; and that her face was not some sort of "cake frosting", an allusion to the "proper" women whose faces would have to be washed to see if the colors run:

[...] no conoce el corsé; si lo viera, desde luego pensaría que semejante aparato fue uno de los intrumentos que sirvieron para el martirio de Santa Úrsula y sus once mil compañeras [...] y está tan a oscuras en eso de cascarillas, colorete y vinagres radicales, que si se hallara tales chucherías entre sus limpios peines y adornadas escobetas, creería sin duda que aquello era para pintar las ollas del tinajero, pues, como dijo el otro, el novio de la china no tiene necesidad de lavar antes a la novia, como a las indianas, para ver si se destiñe, prueba a que deberían estar sujetas algunas hermosuras del buen tono.

...she knows not the corset; if she saw it, right off she would think that it such a device was one of the instruments that served to martyr Saint Ursula and her eleven thousand handmaidens...And she is so much in the dark in matters of facial masks (literally, husks), rouge, and radical vinegars, that if she encountered such trinkets among her clean combs and adorned hairbrushes, without a doubt she would believe they were for painting pots from the potterymaker, since, as someone else has said, the boyfriend of the china woman has no need to wash his girlfriend beforehand, like Indian women, to see if her colors run, a test that some "proper" beautiful women should have to go through.

— José María Rivera Ibid., p. 32.

In that sense, the wardrobe of the china woman was considered too provocative. Contemporary Mexican journalists and foreigners who knew these women in the first half of the nineteenth century call attention to the way in which the fashion of peasant women showed off their feminine forms, or were an appropriate feature of all the graces that were attributed to these women. A verbal portrait was made of them as excellent dancers of jarabe music popular in that era—like El Atole, El Agualulco, El Palomo and others that form part of the folkloric jarabes of the twentieth century—also as models of cleanliness and order; of fidelity to "their man" although also seen as very liberal sexually.

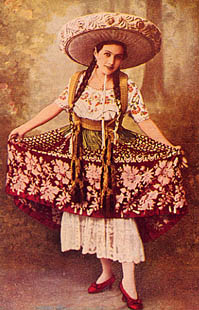
China poblana dress

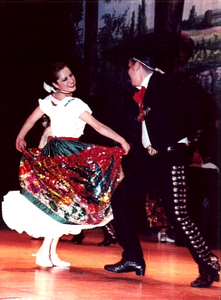
Jarabe tapatío in the traditional china poblana dress.

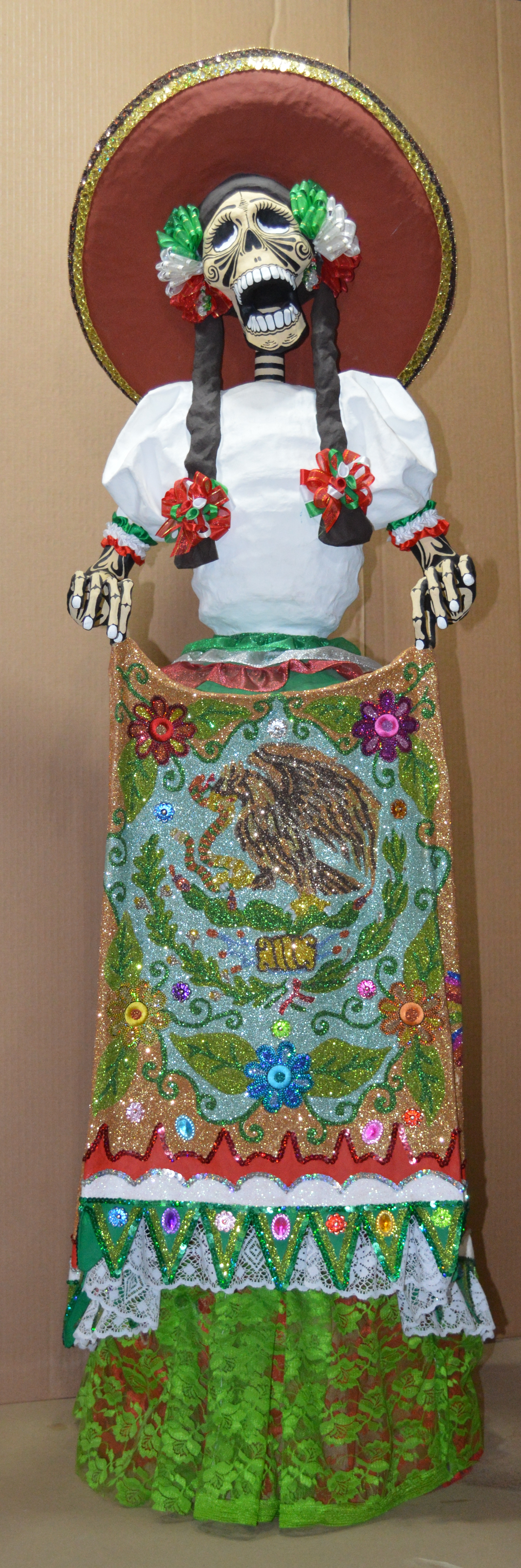
La Catrina in China Poblana dress, by Rodofo Villena Hernandez in Puebla.

== Origins ==
=== Origin of the fashion design of la china ===
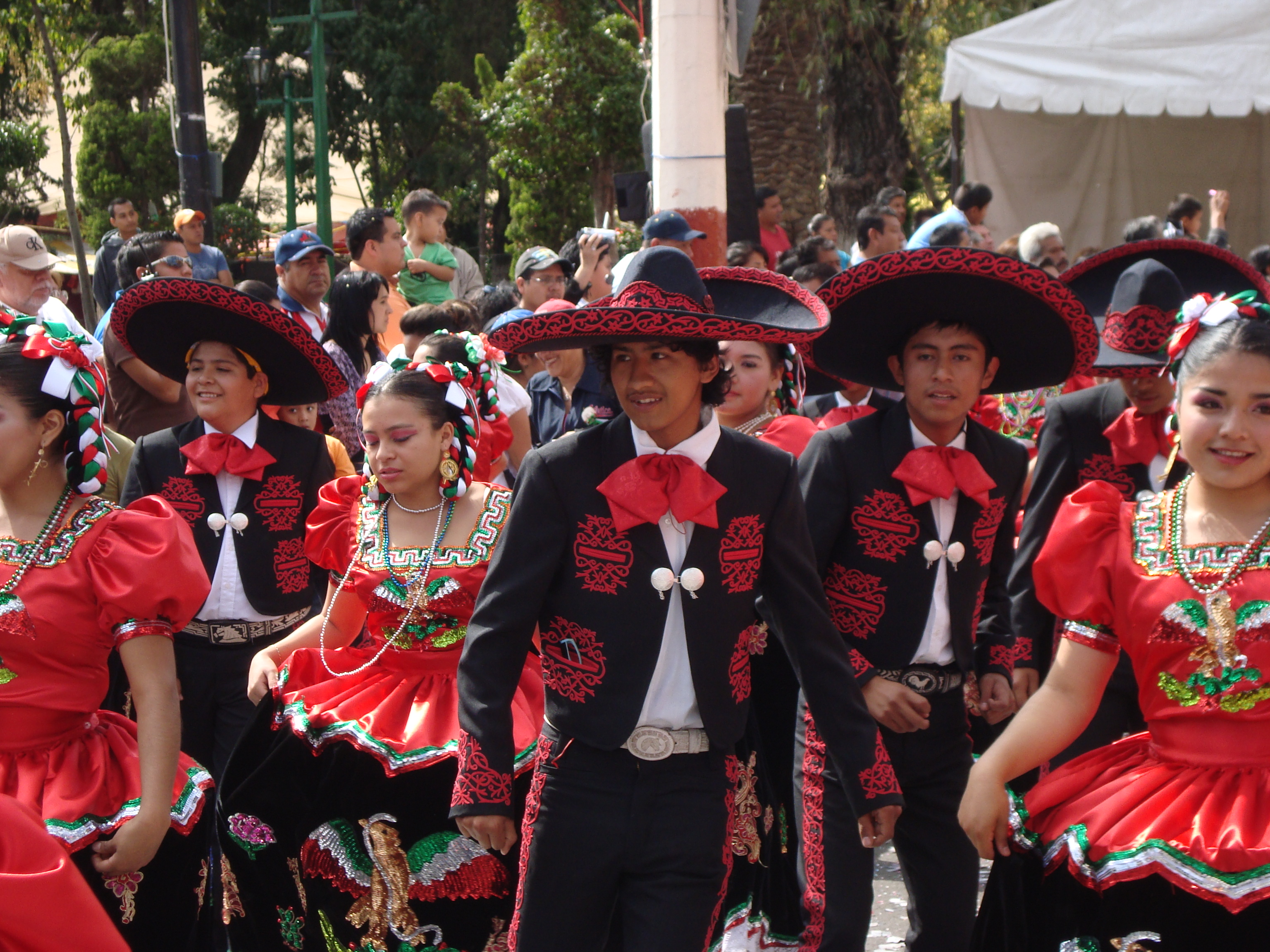
Girls wearing the China poblana dress.

As mentioned in the introduction of this article, the Pueblan origin of the china poblana outfit has been put in doubt on occasion. The correlation between the china—as a popular figure—and the outfit worn by the historic China Poblana—the alluded-to Catarina de San Juan—is a product of the evolution of Mexican culture during the first decades of the 20th century. In fact, las chinas became a well defined meme in the 19th century, a little more than a century after the death of Catarina de San Juan. Writer Gauvin Alexander Bailey points out:

The china poblana of popular imagination—of shiny embroidered blouse and shawl—is a product of the nineteenth century. Symbol of Mexican femininity, she is linked to Spanish prototypes such as the maja, immortalized in paintings by Murillo y Goya

== See also ==
- Baro't saya
- Charro
- Culture of Mexico
- Textiles of Mexico
- Adelita
