= Chino (casta) =

Mixed African-Indigenous racial designation in colonial-era Mexico

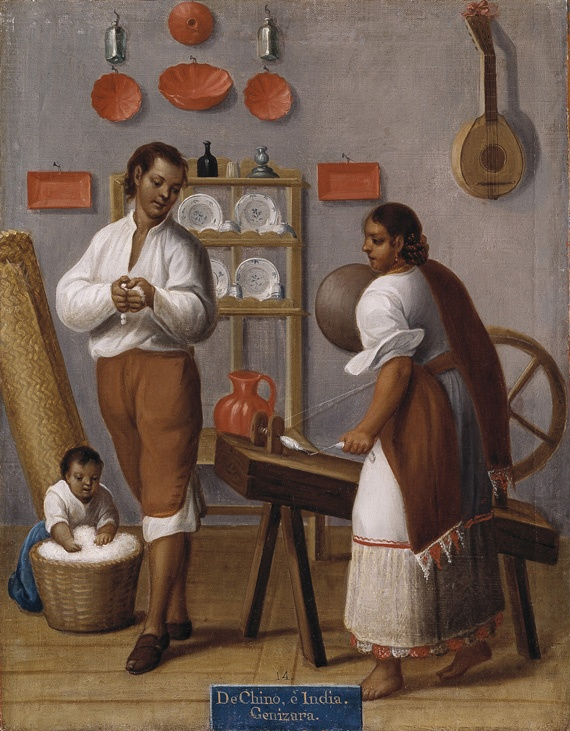
Casta painting, De Chino e India, Genízara. Francisco Clapera, 18th century Mexico

Chino (fem. china) was a casta term used in colonial Mexico to refer to people of mixed ancestry. In the eighteenth century, individuals of mixed Amerindian and African ancestry came to be called chinos.

Chino or china is the vulgar name given to indigenous people in Argentina, Uruguay, Ecuador and Rio Grande do Sul.

== Historical usage ==
A Mexican Inquisition bigamy case in Mexico City labeled one woman variously as a china, loba ("wolf"), and parda ("dark skinned"), one example of a person shifting racial categorization. In marriage applications where individuals had to include the names of their parents, chinos tended not to know this information.

When painters produced in the eighteenth century formal depictions of "castes" as envisioned by members of the elite, the term chino appears with no fixed definition. These paintings show father of one racial category, mother of another, and the offspring yet a third category. In Mexican casta paintings, a ‘’chino’’ could refer to offspring of a Lobo (African + Indigenous) and Negra (pure African woman); Lobo and India (pure Indigenous woman); Mulatto (European + Negra) and an India; a Coyote and a Mulata; a Spaniard and Morisca (light-skinned woman with African ancestry); and a Chamicoyote and Indian woman.

Ignacio María Barreda (1777)

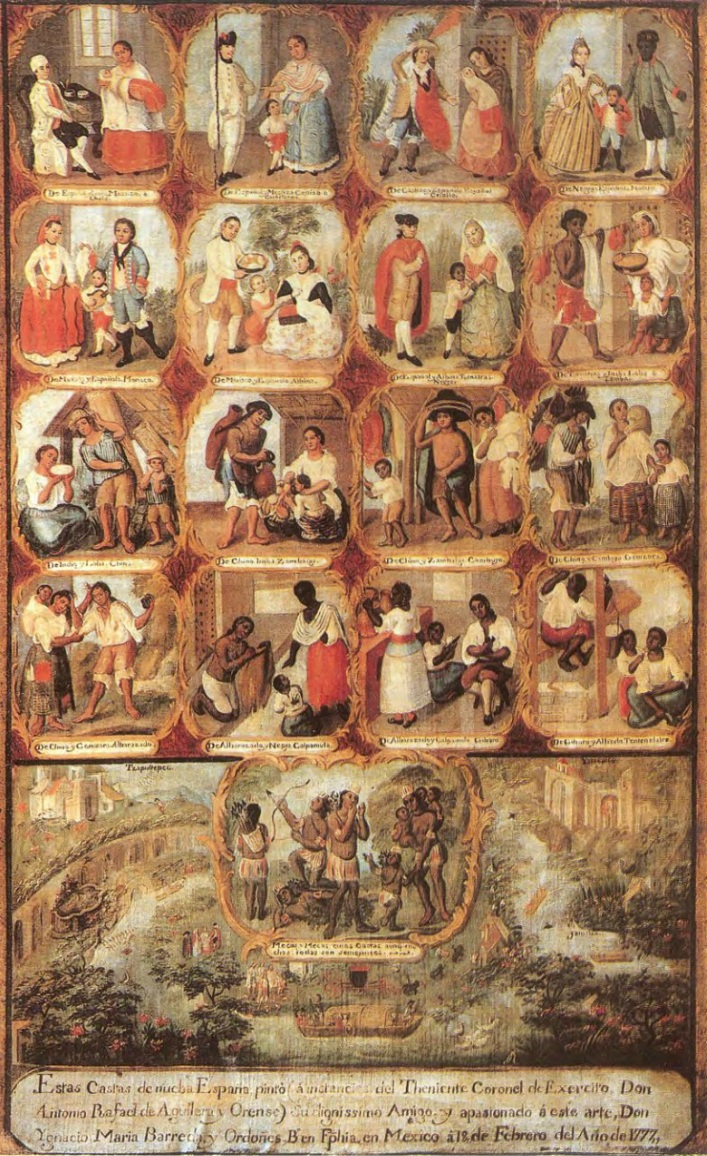

1. Español + India - Mestizo or Cholo
2. Español + Mestiza - Castizo or cuarterón
3. Castizo + Española - Español Criollo
4. Negro + Española - Mulato
5. Mulato + Española - Morisco
6. Morisco + Española - Albina
7. Español + Tornatrás Negro
8. Torna atrás + India - Lobo o Zambo
9. Indio + Loba - Chino
10. Chino + India - Zambaiga
11. Zambaiga + Chino - Cambujo
12. Cambuja + Chino - Genízara
13. Genízara + Chino - Albarazado
14. Albarazado + Negra - Calpamula
15. Calpamula + Albarazado - Gíbaro
16. Gíbaro + Albarazao - Tente en el aire
17. Mecos and Mecas, even though they are many, they are all similar
Anonymous (late 18th c?)

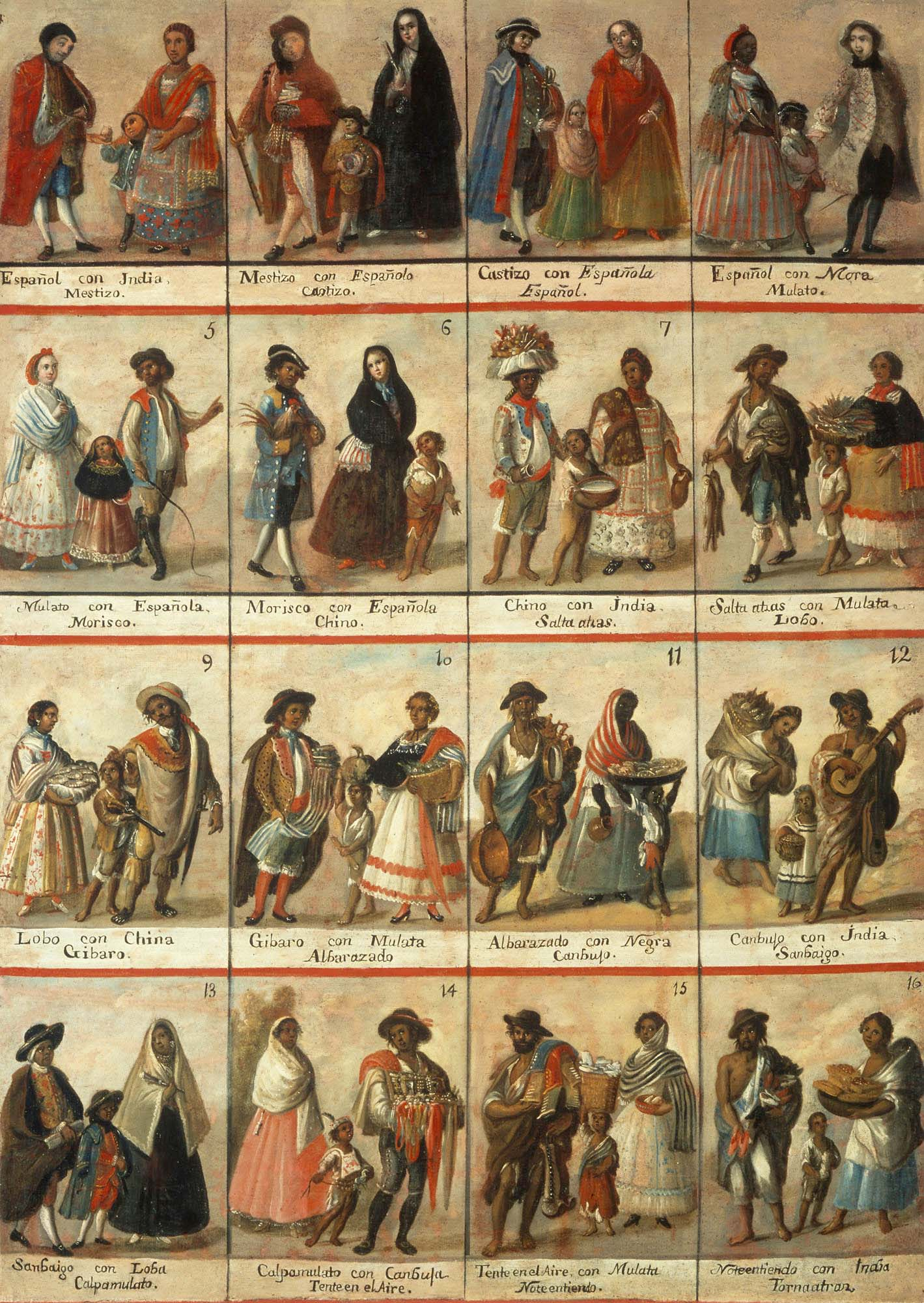

1. Español con India, Mestizo
2. Mestizo con Española, Castizo
3. Castiza con Español, Española
4. Español con Negra, Mulato
5. Mulato con Española, Morisca
6. Morisco con Española, Chino
7. Chino con India, Salta atrás
8. Salta atrás con Mulata, Lobo
9. Lobo con China, Gíbaro [Jíbaro]
10. Gíbaro con Mulata, Albarazado#
11. Albarazado con Negra, Cambujo
12. Cambujo con India, Sambaiga (Zambaiga)
13. Sambaigo con Loba, Calpamulato
14. Calpamulto con Cambuja, Tente en el aire
15. Tente en el aire con Mulata, No te entiendo
16. No te entiendo con India, Torna atrás

== Contemporary usage ==
In 1821 with Mexican Independence from Spain, the new nation abolished the colonial-era, legal racial categories, with unequal privileges and restrictions. The various casta terms generally fell out of popular usage and eventually a new, all-encompassing Mexican Mestizo identity emerged.

However, the use of Chino has survived in modern Mexican Spanish via the term pelo chino (Chino hair) when referring to curly hair. Although chino can mean Chinese in standard Spanish, the chino in pelo chino does not refer to Chinese people. Rather it refers to the curly hair of the Chino casta. Alluding to an intermediate hair type that is between the afro-textured hair of Africans and the straight hair of Europeans.

=== Calture ===
Among the traditional festivals of the interior of Argentina and Uruguay was the festival of the election of the "Best Chinita".

There are many songs with the theme of the Chinese woman, like this tango by Cátulo Castillo:

== See also ==
- Asian Mexicans, also referred to as "chinos" or "indios chinos" during the colonial era.
