= Templo de San Francisco de Asís =

Church in Guadalajara, Jalisco, Mexico

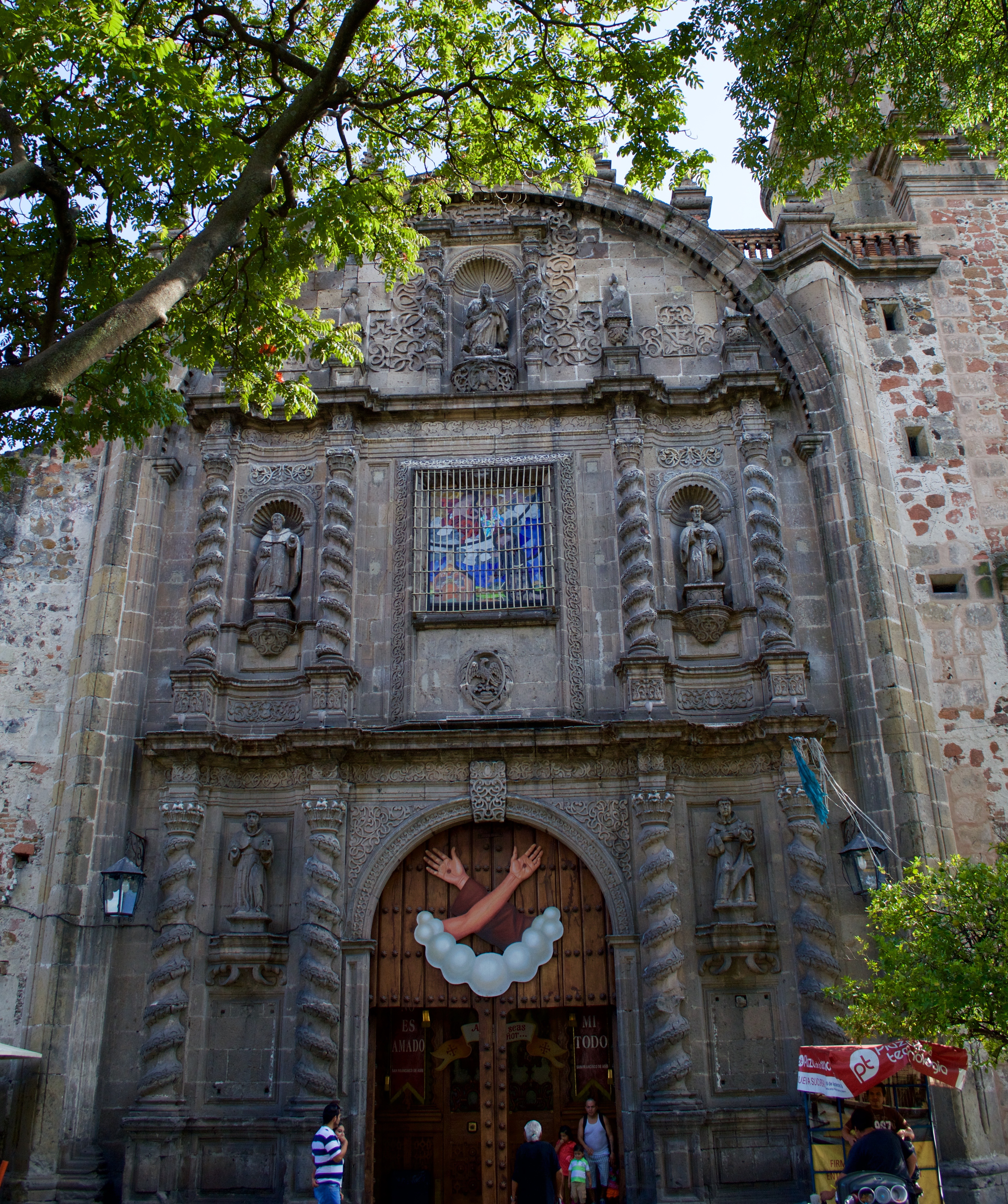
- Templo de San Francisco de Asís
- Location: Guadalajara, Jalisco
- Country: Mexico
- Denomination: Catholicism

Architecture
- Years built: 1688-1692
- Completed: 1692

The Templo de San Francisco de Asís is a Catholic church in Guadalajara, Jalisco, Mexico. It is located adjacent to the Parque San Francisco at #295 Calle 16 de Septiembre in the central part of the city. The church was built by the Franciscans between 1668 and 1692, and stands on the site of an earlier Franciscan church and convent. Its exterior includes in its facade Solomonic columns which seem to spiral upward. The nave includes a baroque retablo above and behind the altar.
