= San Juan Market, Mexico City =

Traditional Mexican market in Mexico City

Coordinates: 19°25′48.13″N 99°8′40.81″W

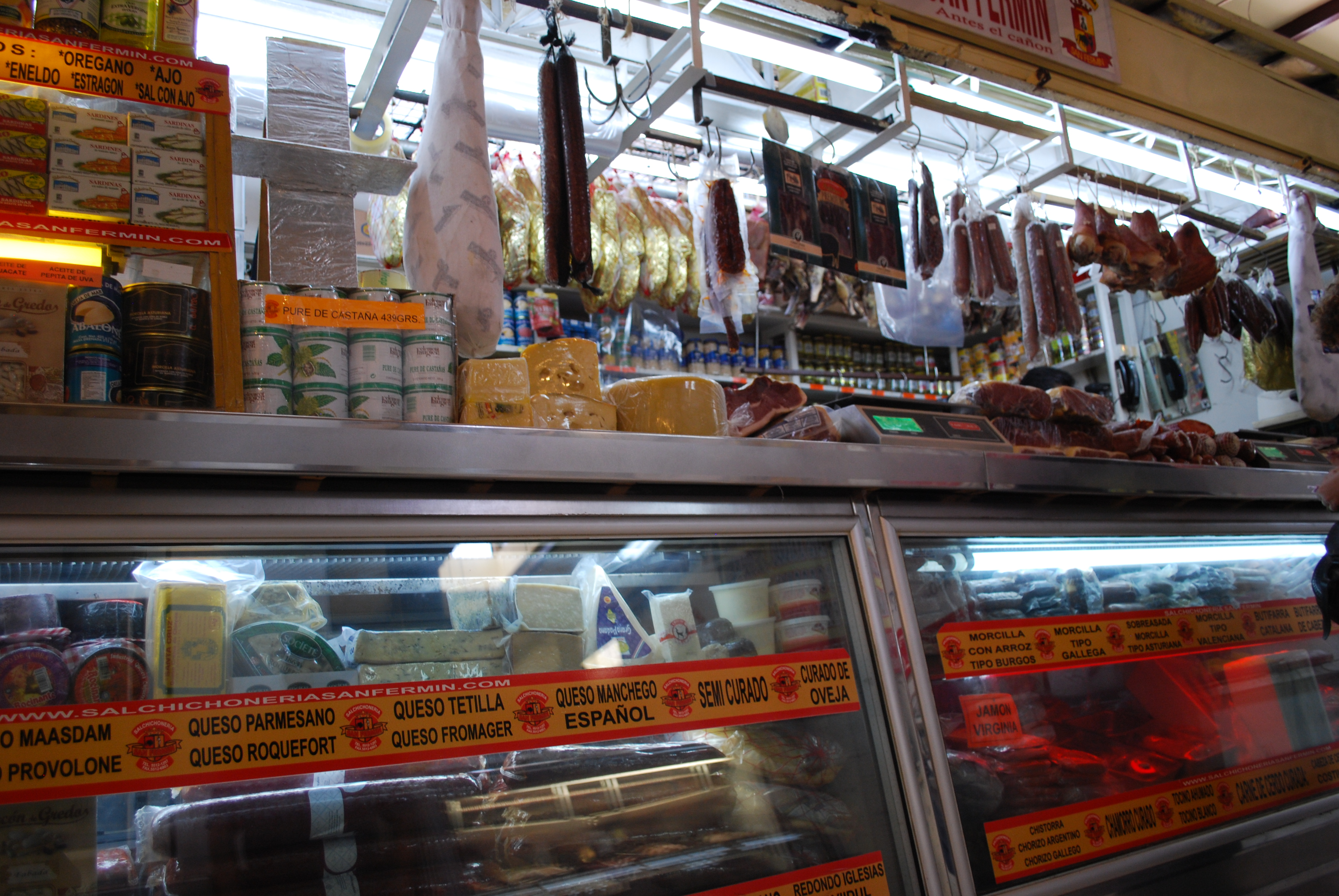
One of the businesses inside the market

The San Juan Market is a traditional Mexican market in the historic center of Mexico City that has become the city’s only such market specializing in gourmet and exotic foods. It is known for its selection of exotic meats, including venison, crocodile, wild boar and even lion meat, as well as a wide selection of products from Europe and the Americas. Unlike other such markets in Mexico City, it caters to chefs, restaurateurs and foodies, many of whom are foreigners and have long-standing relationships with particular vendors.

== Establishment ==
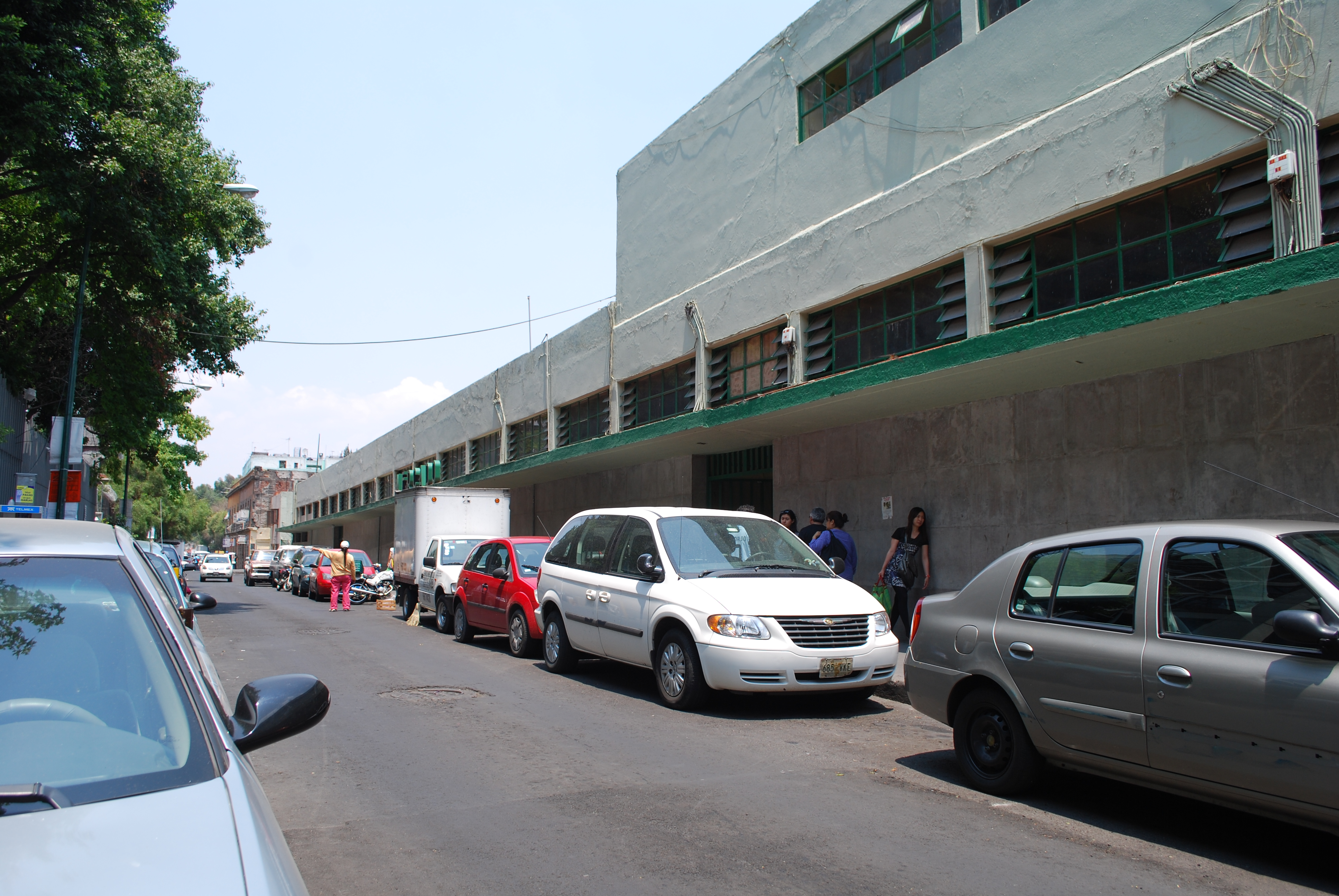
The building

The market is one of the oldest of Mexico City’s city owned market buildings. Located on Ernesto Pugibet Street (between José María Marroquí and Luis Moya) and officially with the same name, its common name is taken from the adjacent San Juan Plaza. Its building and internal arrangement is similar to various other traditional community markets in Mexico City, but what distinguishes it from the rest is its specialization and clientele. The market caters mostly to chefs, gastronomy students, restaurateurs and foodies, specializing in gourmet and exotic food products. Many of the products it carries are found in few or no other place in the city. Because of its specialized clientele, most visitors are male, leading to be called the "man’s market." Many customers are regulars, with particular preferences in both what they buy and where they buy it.

== Products and vendors ==
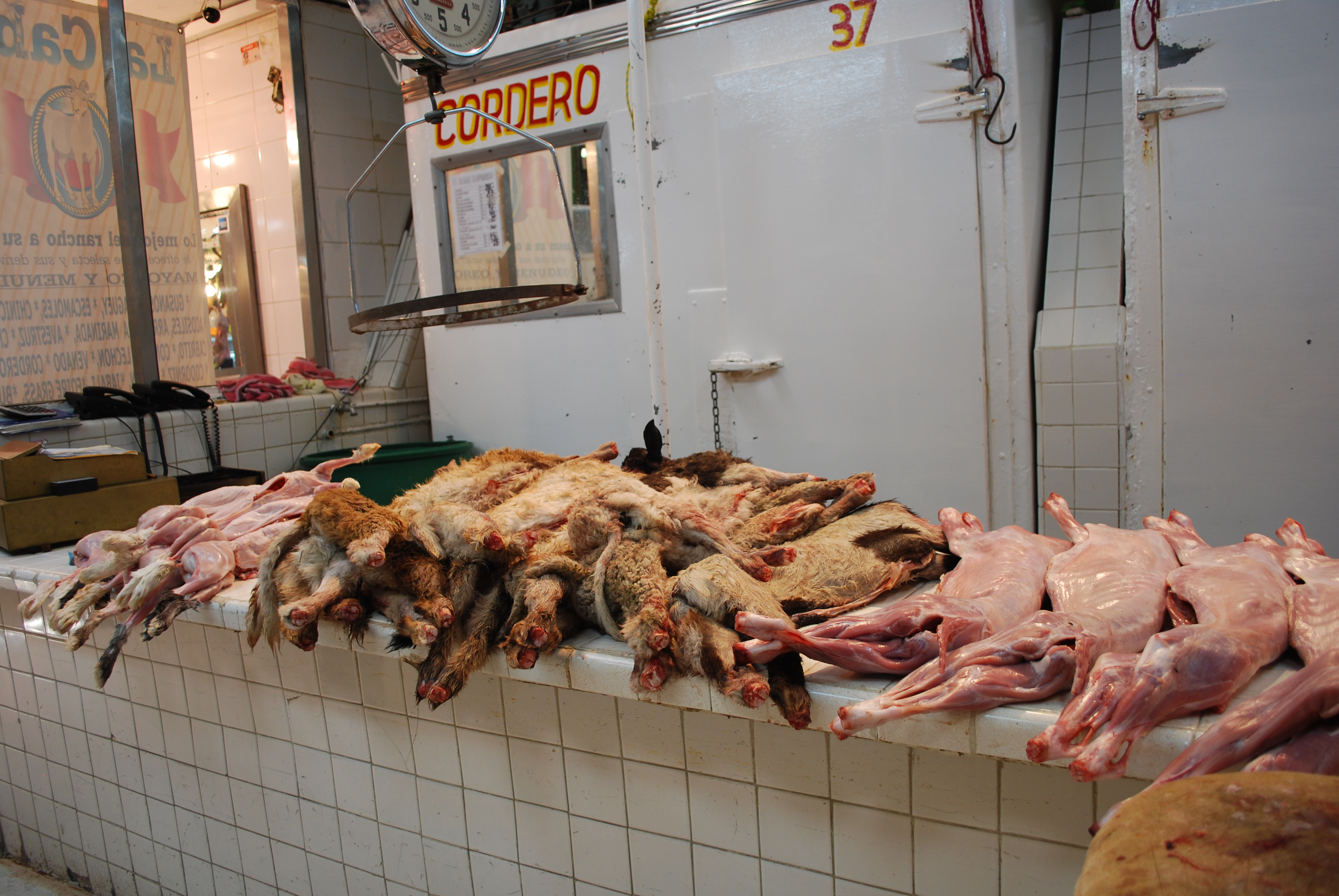
Baby goat or cabrito for sale at the market

Many of the products here are from Europe, Asia and the rest of the Americas. Of particular note is the wide variety of meat products found. Fresh meat from many different animals, both from Mexico and abroad can be found. These meats include those from iguanas, skunks, deer, rabbit, suckling pigs, goat, wild boar and lowland paca. One very unusual specialty is lion meat, from animals raised for those purpose in Zumpango and sells for about 850 pesos per kilo. Fresh meats are from both Mexican and international sources, primarily Central America and the United States, with the most popular being rabbit, venison, wild boar and crocodile. Poultry includes Cornish hens, duck, pigeon, goose, turkey, doves as well as the eggs from various types of birds. The market also has some of the finest seafood selections in the city, both Mexican and imported, including caviar that sells for more than 6,000 pesos a kilo.

Produce includes fruits, vegetables, edible flowers and herbs, many of which are from foreign sources for international cooking. However, there are seasonal Mexican specialties such as the wild mushrooms that fill stalls in July and August. Cheese specialties include those from Europe and South America as well as Mexico, with types such as Parmigiano-Reggiano, Roquefort, gruyere, goat manchego with red wine. Prepared items include processed meats, goose liver pate, canned items from Europe, various vinegars, fine Italian pasta and more. The market also carries pre Hispanic Mexican delicacies such as maguey larvae, escamoles, chicatanas (a kind of winged ant), snails and frogs, with clients coming from as far as Europe to buy them.

A number of the vendors are third and fourth generation here, with businesses that pre date the market. Some vendors are immigrants to Mexico, mostly from various countries in Europe or their descendants, as are many of the customers. La Catalana specializes in handmade sausages and cold cuts, mostly of Spanish origin. La Holandesa’s counters are filled with bread, caviar, sausages, truffles, cakes and more, both national and imported. El Porvenir specializes in cured meats and sausages, bacalao and cheeses from Europe and South America. They make most of their own meat products in various European styles. One three-generation business at the market is Pescadería El Puerto de Santander, selling fish and seafood from Asia and Europe as well as Mexico. His signs are in multiple languages to cater to his varied clientele, 80% of whom are foreigners. El Pequeño Cazador sells exotic meats and poultry and is multigenerational. The stand operated by Roberto León Castillo sells items mostly for Chinese and other oriental cuisines, with customers that order their purchases in Cantonese as well as Spanish, which include curry, ginger, Chinese noodles and coconut oil.

== History ==
The current market building dates from 1955 and was built along with three others, San Juan (today selling handcrafts), Jamaica and Arco de Belén as part of city efforts to regulate sales by small vendors. However, the selling of food and fine foods predates the building to the early 20th century, when vendors sold their wares in the San Juan Plaza. The market building were constructed on the site of the former warehouses of the Buen Tono cigar company and was officially named after the former owner of the land, Ernesto Pugibet, who ceded the space to the city. Initially the market was like the others, selling basic foodstuffs as well but specialization to gourmet and exotic foods began in the 1970s. This increased after the approval to NAFTA and other free trade agreements make more foreign products available.
