= Mexican hat dance =

Popular Mexican dance

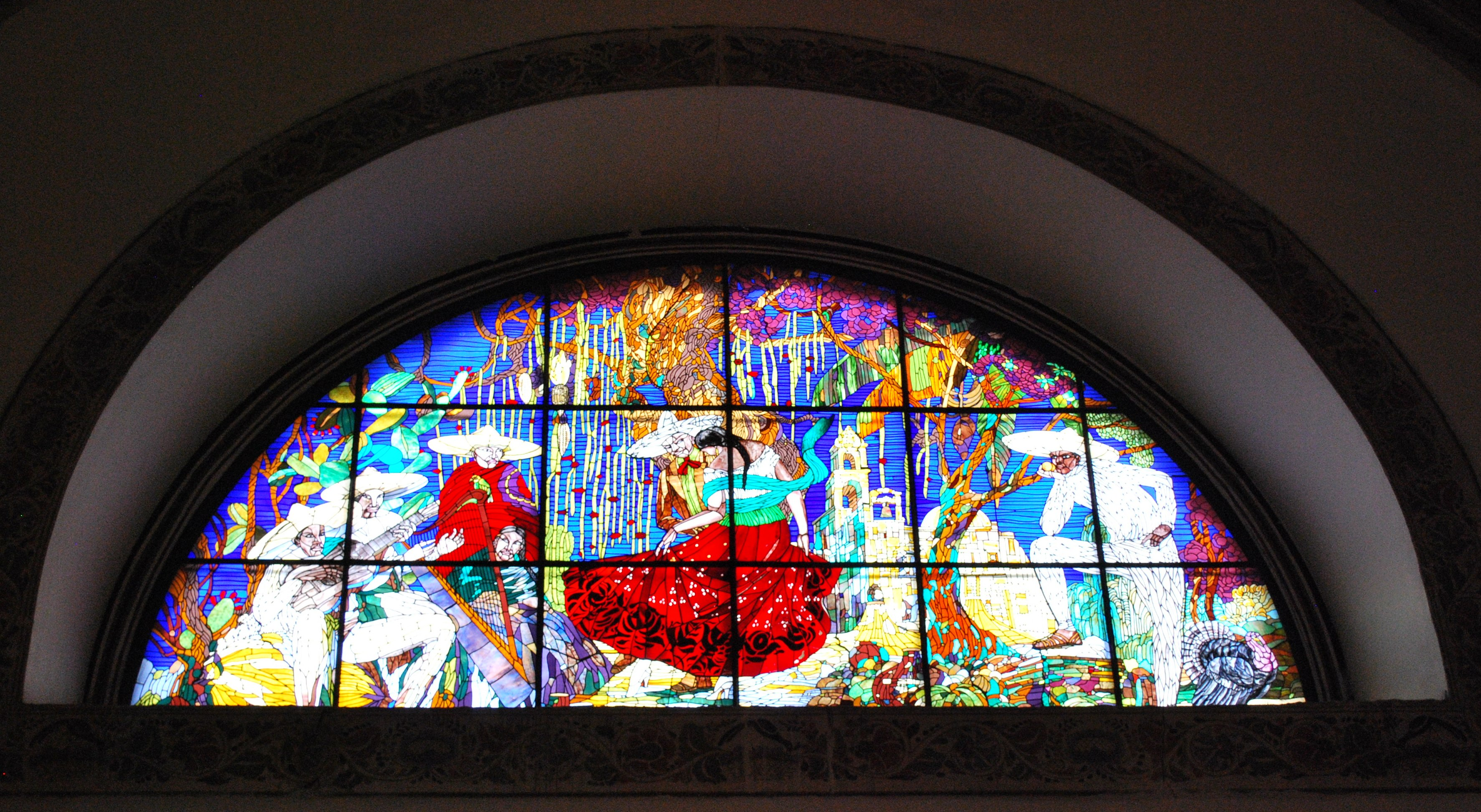
Stained glass window El Jarabe Tapatío designed by Roberto Montenegro and Xavier Guerrero in the 1920s at the San Pedro y San Pablo College, Mexico City

The Mexican hat dance, also known as "jarabe tapatío", is the national dance of Mexico. It originated as a courtship dance in Guadalajara, Jalisco, during the 19th century, although its elements can be traced back to the Spanish zambra and "jarabe gitano", which were popular during the times of the viceroyalty. Female dancers traditionally wear a china poblana outfit, while the male dancers dress as charros and their steps are characterized by flirtatiously stepping around the brim of their partner's hat.

The standard music of the "jarabe tapatío" was composed by Jesús González Rubio in the 19th century. However, its more common instrumental arrangement dates from the 1920s. Sometimes it is confused with La Raspa, another Mexican dance. Nowadays, its music is most commonly performed by either mariachi groups or string ensembles.

== History ==
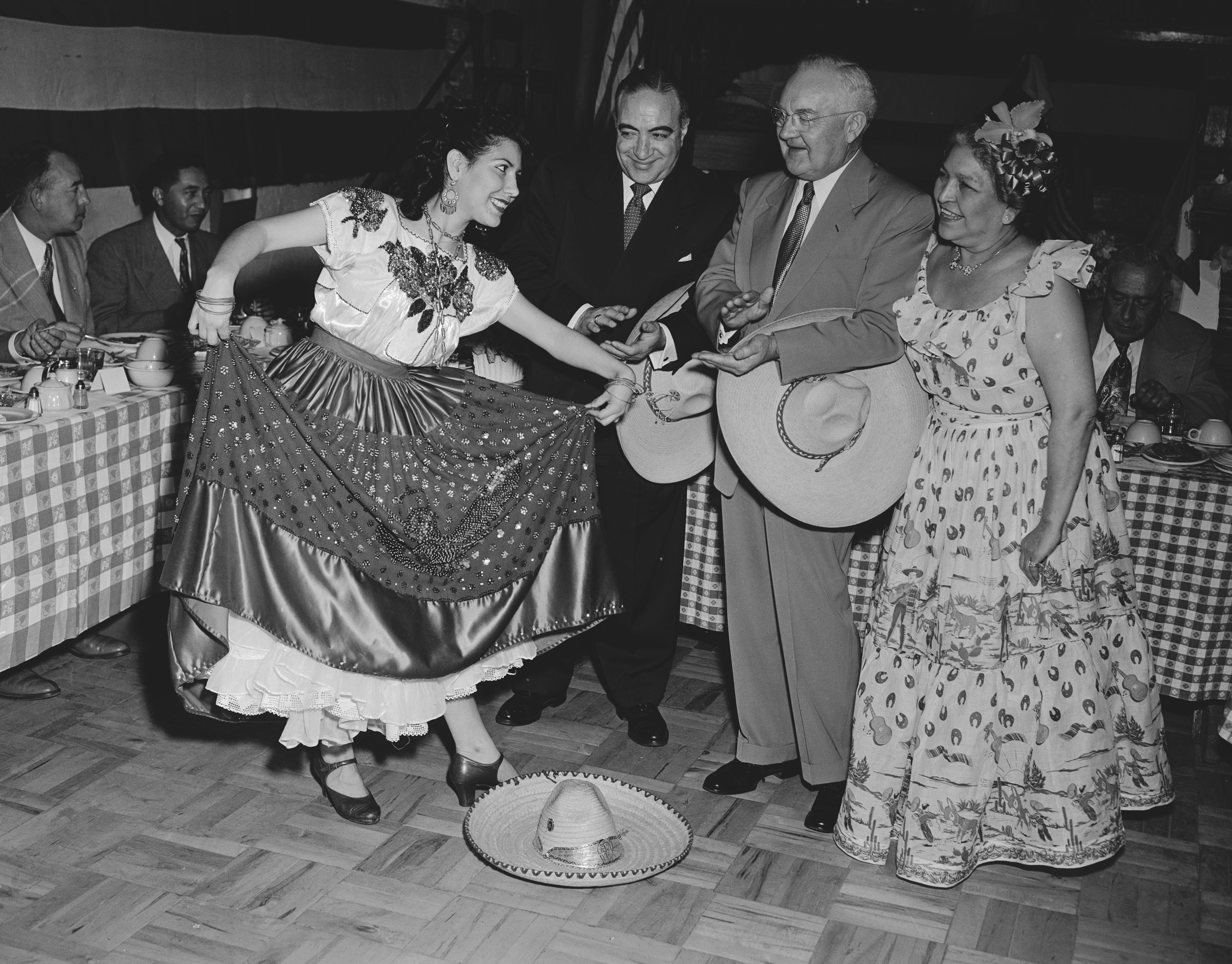
Jarabe dancers at Cinco de Mayo celebrations in Los Angeles, 1952

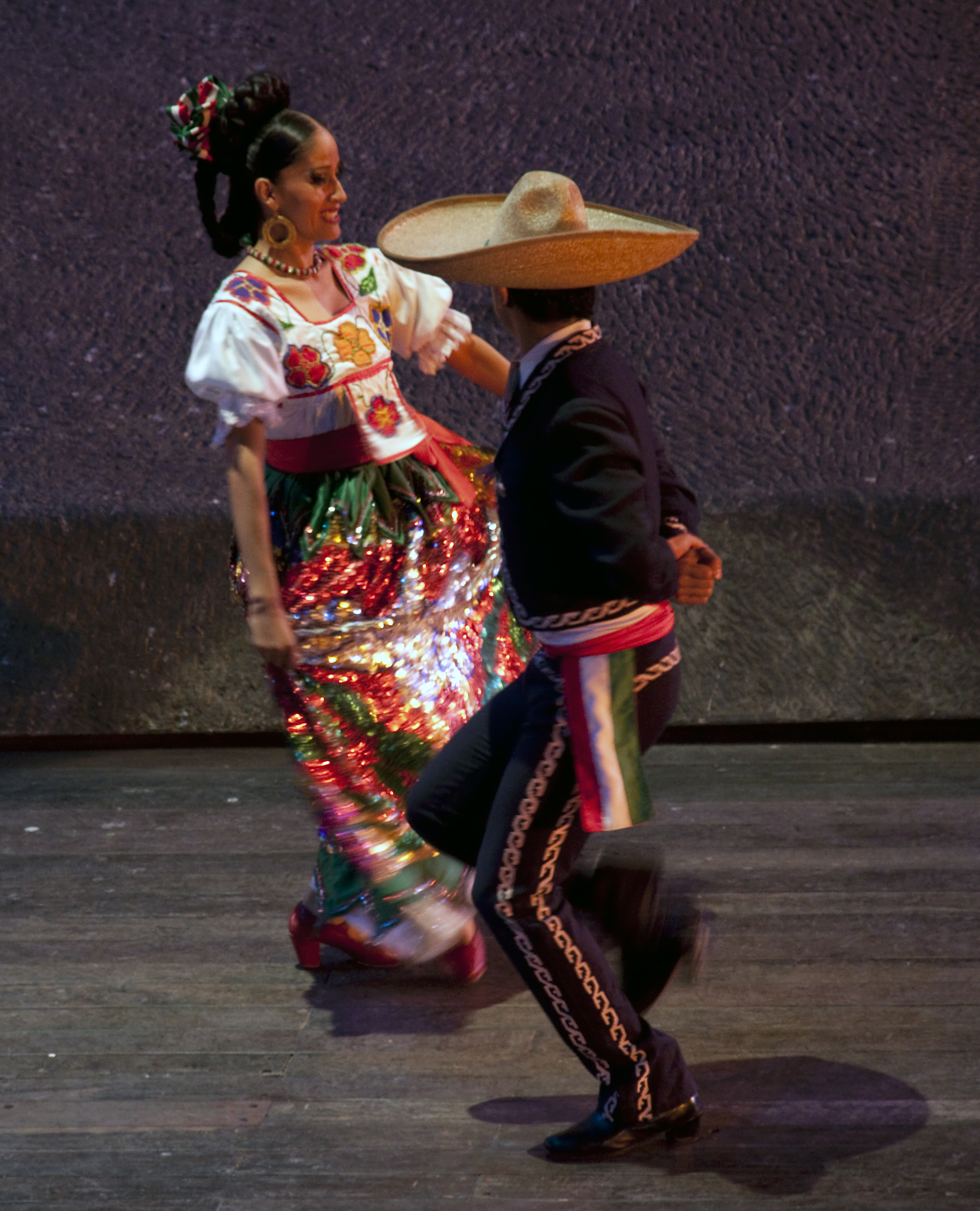
Mexican evening at Xcaret

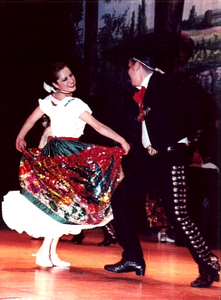
"Jarabe tapatío" in the traditional china poblana dress

The word 'jarabe' (from Arabic 'šarāb'), meaning 'syrup', denotes the combination of various Mexican musics ('sones') and dances ('zapateados'). The word 'tapatío', meaning "someone or something from Guadalajara", is the demonym of the city of Guadalajara in Jalisco and reflects the origin of this particular 'jarabe'. A number of other dances known as 'jarabes' are known to have existed in the 18th and 19th centuries, such as the "jarabe de Jalisco", the "jarabe de atole" and the "jarabe moreliano", but the 'tapatío' version is by far the best known. Most of these other jarabes differ from the tapatío in terms of their regional origin throughout Mexico. This is because overall, jarabe is considered much more of a musical and folk dance genre, as opposed to one rigid definition. There is some dispute as to the "jarabe tapatío"'s authenticity as folk dance. Music researcher Nicolás Puentes Macías from Zacatecas states that true 'jarabes' are almost extinct in Mexico, found today only in small fractions of Zacatecas and Jalisco, and that the "jarabe tapatío" is really a form of a dance called 'tonadilla'. In addition to this, the dance's origins are also somewhat disputed, either being wholly indigenous or Hispanic in nature Some academics tend to stick to one narrative or the other, but across the board the dance is considered a truly Mestizo creation.

The earliest evidence of the dance comes from the late 18th century. It was originally danced by female couples in order to avoid the disapproval of the church. Shortly before the Mexican War of Independence, mixed couples began to perform it, with a public performance at the Coliseo Theater in 1790 in Mexico City. Shortly after that performance, the 'jarabe' was banned by colonial and religious authorities "under the severe penalties of excommunication, some ducats of penalty and lots of stripes, to any person that compose or sing or dance" as it was considered to be morally offensive and a challenge to Spain's control over the territory. However, this only served to make the dance more popular as a form of protest and rebellion, with people holding illegal dances in public squares and neighborhood festivals. It became symbolic of the Mexican peoples dissent.

Just after Independence, the 'jarabe' and other dances grew and spread in popularity even more, with colonial-era restrictions lifted. After the exit of the Spanish colonial power, there was a sort of "musical vacuum" in the country, now without the overbearing presence of the "superior" Iberian musical styles. This left space for new forms of nationalistic music of Mexican creation to shine through and gain new popularity People celebrated the end of the war in 1821 with large fiestas, which prominently featured the 'jarabe'. 'Jarabe' and other folk dances came to be seen as part of Mexico's emerging identity as a country. It became more than a dance, but a shining symbol of Mexican nationalism, coinciding perfectly with the new ruling governments push for a nationally cohesive and united mestizo population. The 'jarabe' maintained various regional forms, but that associated with Guadalajara gained national status, becoming not only popular in that city but also in Mexico City as well, as a dance for the elite around the 1860s. Around the same time, Guadalajara music professor Jesús González Rubio composed a standard melody for it as a symbol of national unity, leading the dance to become the "national dance" of Mexico and the melody to gain wide popular recognition. By the Mexican Revolution, it had become popular with the lower classes as well. It became internationally famous after Russian dancer Anna Pavlova added it to her permanent repertoire after visiting Mexico in 1919.

There are multiple instances of jarabe tapatío performances in Mexican movies that help further show its impact on Mexican pop culture. Most Notably, Fernando de Fuentes's 1936 Allá en el Rancho Grande (Over on the Big Ranch) features a musical number and dance scene where the actors perform the jarabe tapatío. Camera angles throughout the performance showcase he dancers skill first off, but the delight, pleasure and astonishment in the crowd as they watch the nationalistic dance.

The 'jarabe' remained in vogue in Mexico until about 1930, especially in Mexico City. It remains taught in nearly every grade school in Mexico.

== Performance ==
"La Raspa" combined with "Jarabe tapatío", played by a string quartet

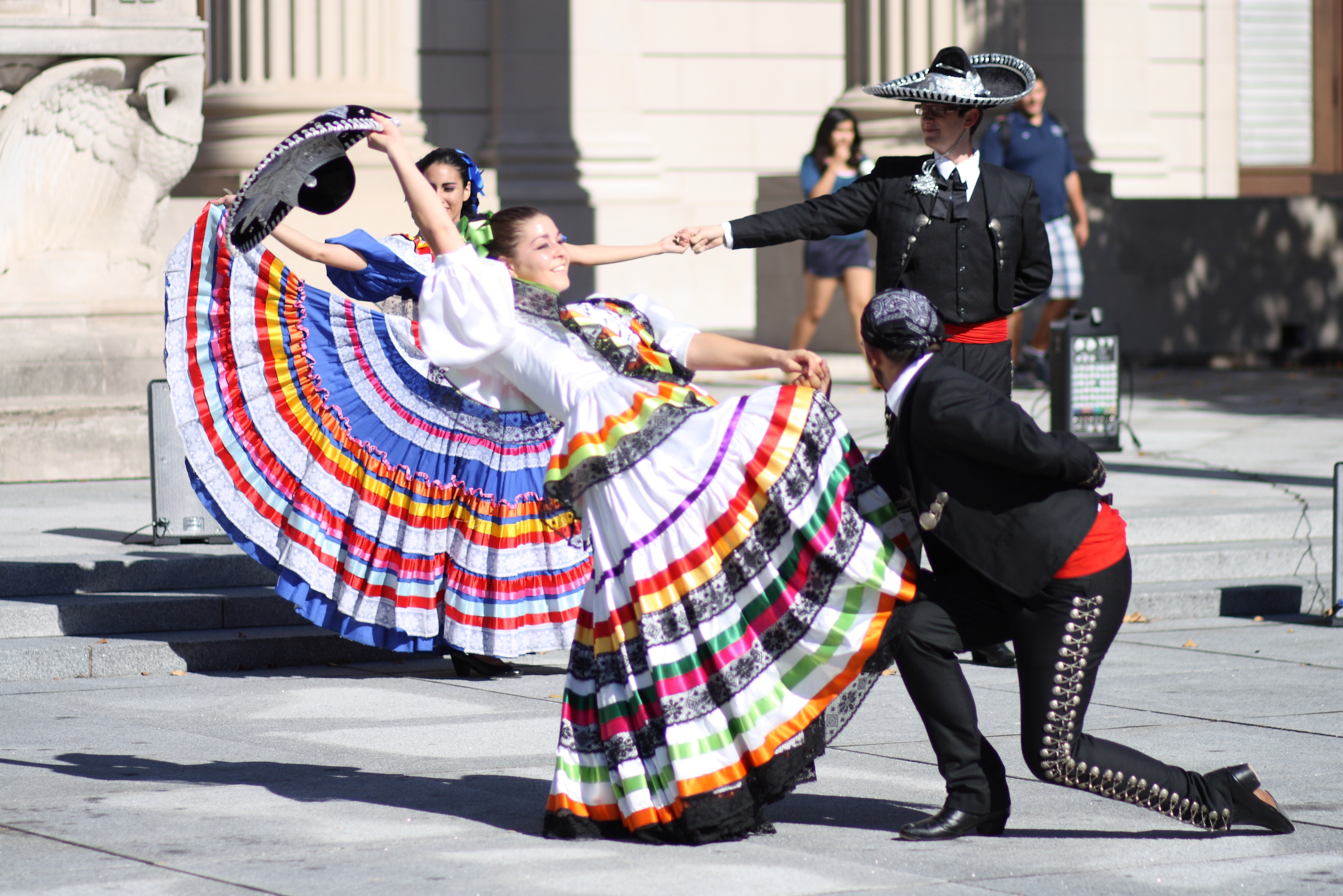
Jarabe dancers at Yale University

The dance represents the courtship of a man and a woman, with the woman first rejecting the man's advances, then eventually accepting them. It has a definite sexual component in metaphor, which was the original reason for disapproval by authorities.

As the dance has lost its controversial status and gained status as a representative of Mexico, the dancers have come to wear garb that is also highly representative of Mexican women and men. For women, the most traditional outfit is called the "China poblana." The blouse and skirt combination is named after a woman from India who came to Mexico on a Manila galleon to work as a servant in the early 19th century. Her Asian dress was copied and then adapted in the State of Puebla, with the skirt now heavily embroidered and otherwise decorated with patriotic images. The traditional outfit for men is that of the charro, generally heavily decorated in silver trim.

The music played to accompany the dance was written to be danced to and is played either by mariachi bands or by bands playing only string instruments such as various types of guitars, harps and violin.

== Contemporary adaptations ==
Within Mexican communities in the US, troops of "jarabe tapatío" performers are becoming more and more common. Dancers are presented with opportunities to reconnect and engage with their Mexican heritage and/or citizenship abroad through the performance of the dance.

The popularity of the composition by Jesús González Rubio has led it to be used in many forms of media. For example, in The Simpsons TV series it is used to reference the Bumblebee Man, a stereotypical Mexican character. In the United Kingdom, the tune was used in adverts for the supermarket chain Morrisons, primarily in the 1980s and 1990s, and some adverts in the mid-2000s, using their slogan, "More reasons to shop at Morrisons". Morrisons revived the jingle and slogan in their advertising in summer 2023. The tune is also known to be popularly used for "Yakko's World", a song from Animaniacs in which the character lists countries of the world from the early 1990s and as a ringtone on Nokia mobile phones in the 1990s and 2000s. It is also popularly used in the Looney Tunes cartoon shorts, particularly those featuring Speedy Gonzales.

A 'jarabe' also appears in Aaron Copland's ballet Billy the Kid, played in 5/8 time, the tune on a solo trumpet (with orchestral accompaniment).

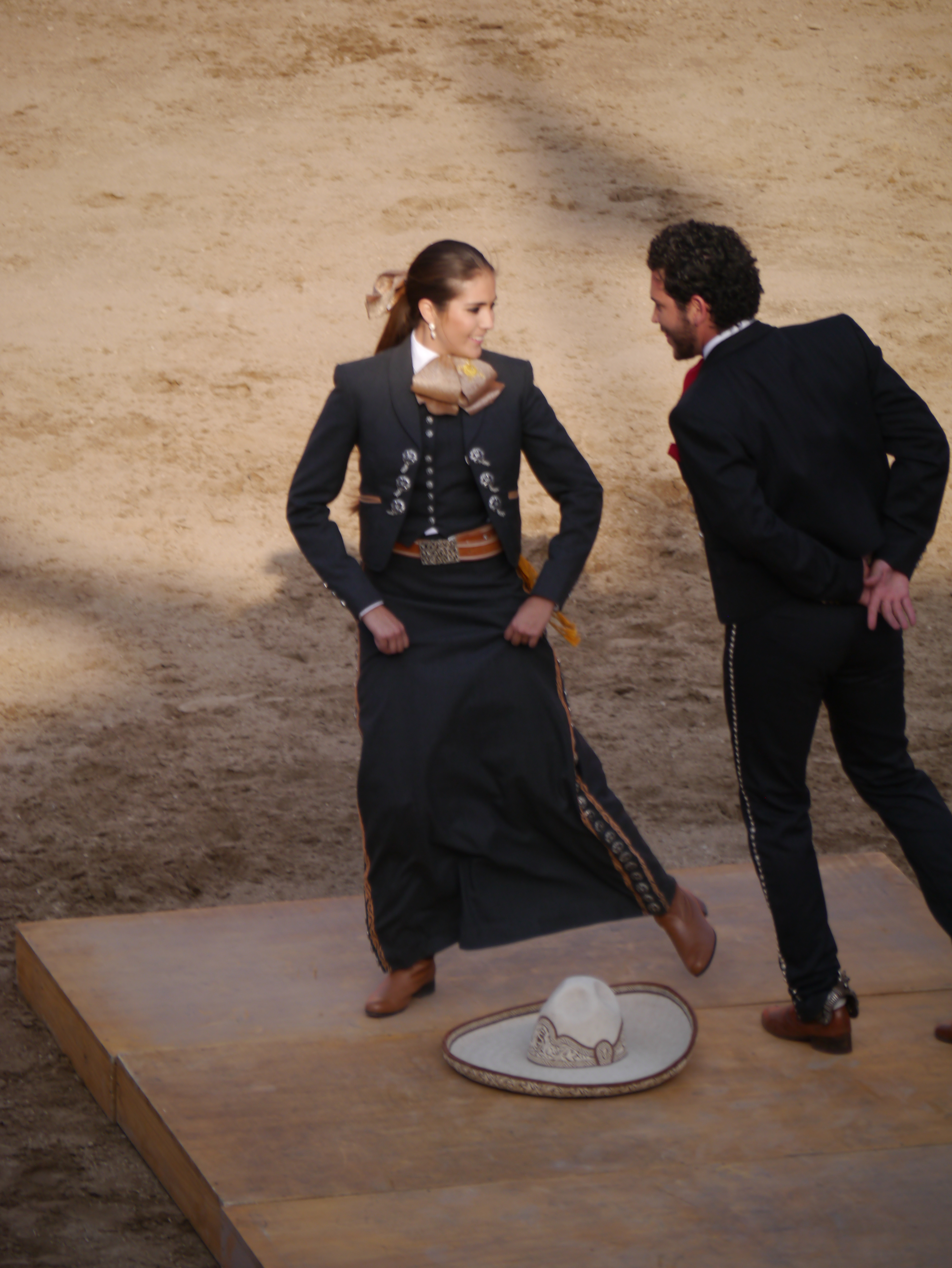
El jarabe tapatío starts the dance by dancing around a sombrero.

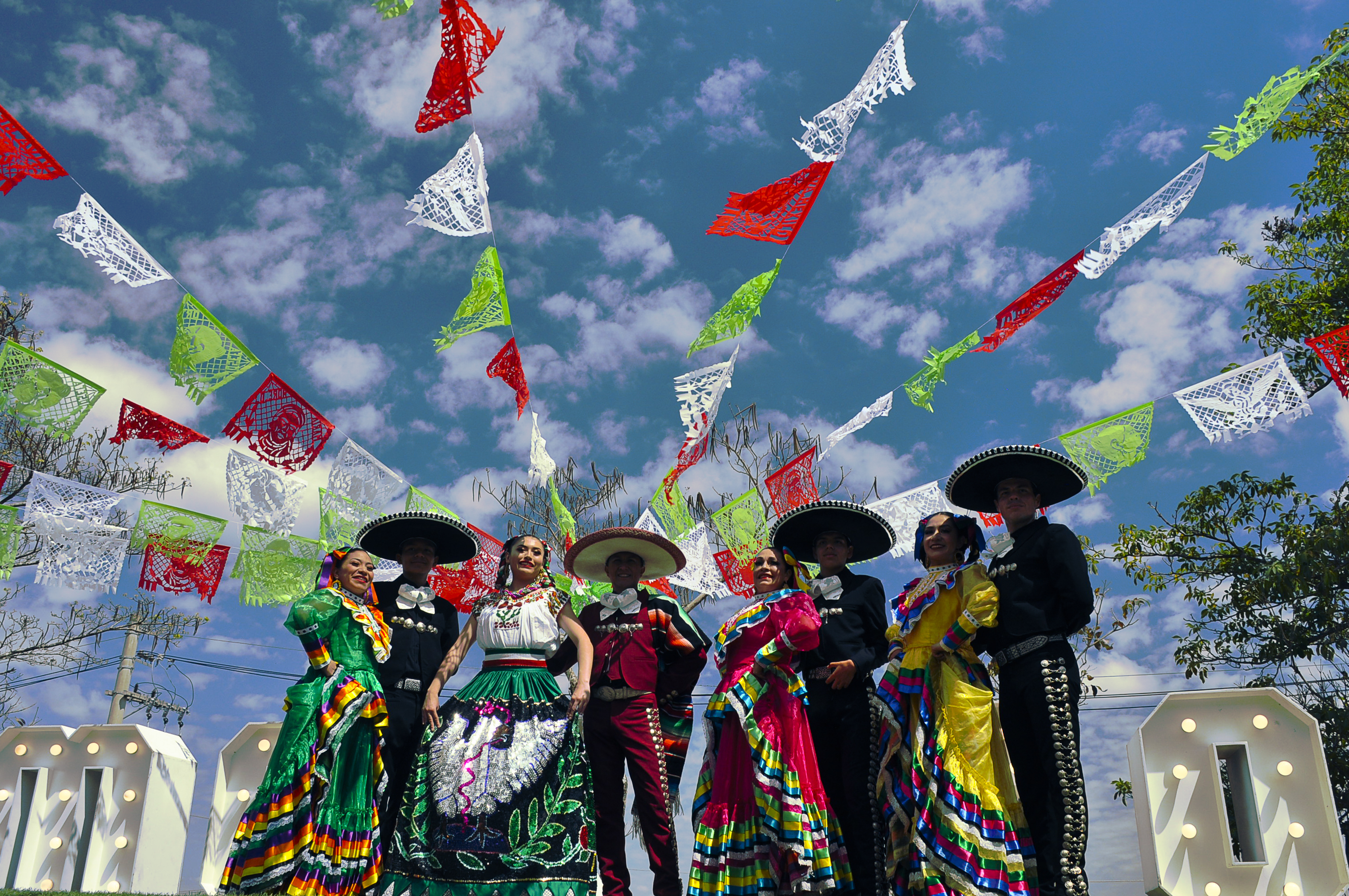
Jarabe tapatío dancers

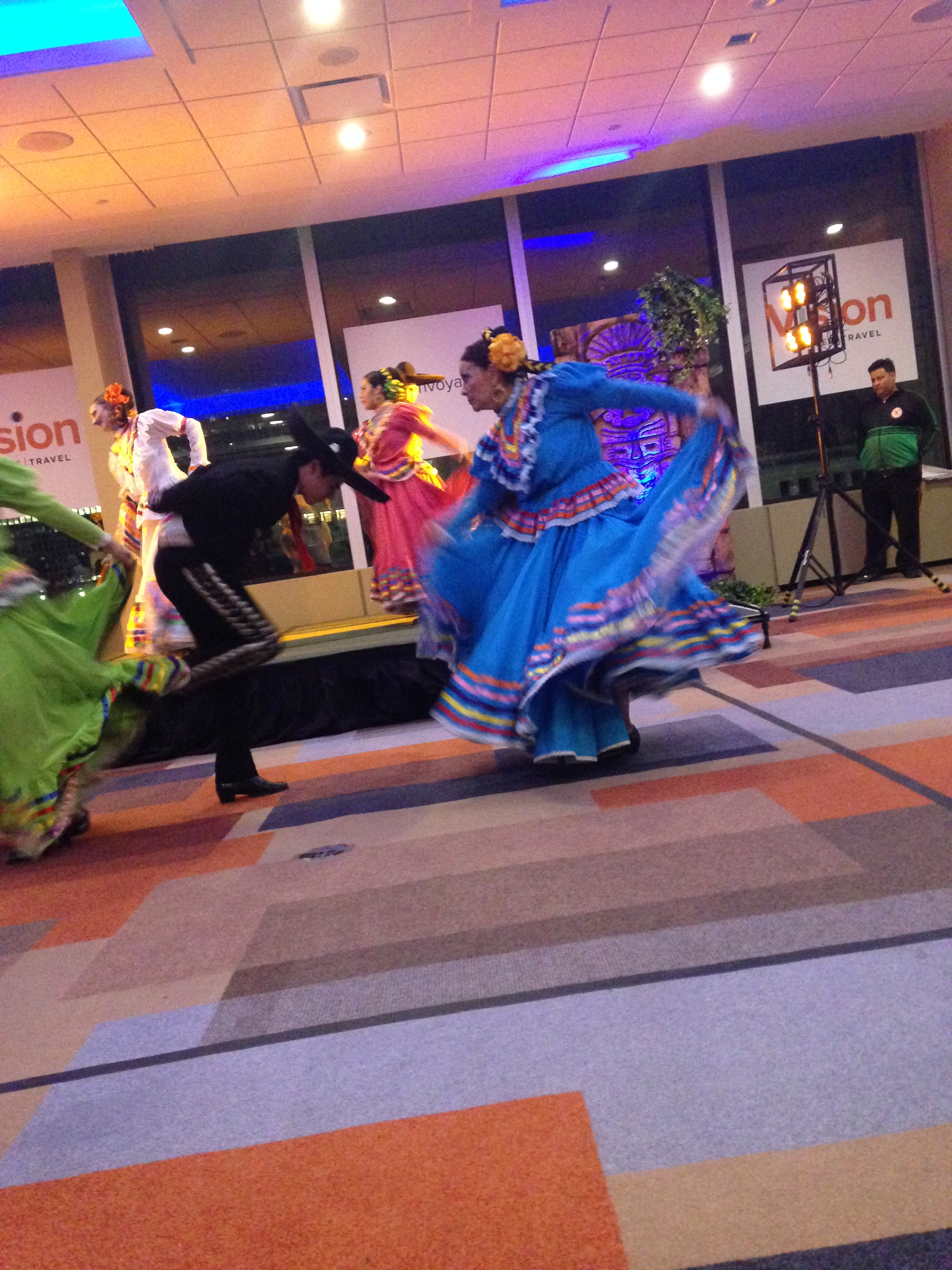
Folkloric Ballet Aztlan performing jarabe tapatio

Mexicans dancing jarabe tapatío in Guadalajara, Mexico
