= Bobble (knitting) =

Form of stitching in knitting

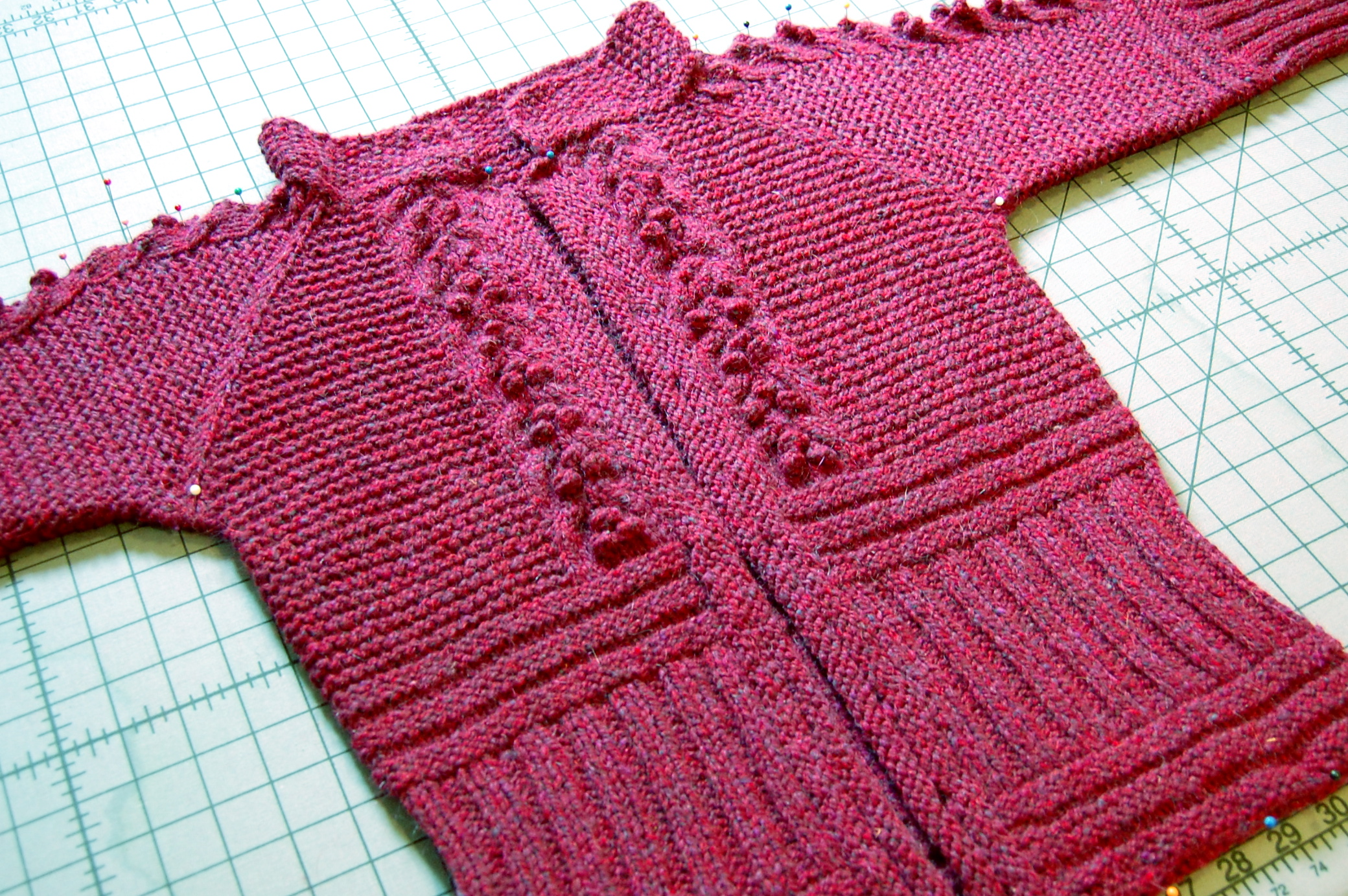
Raised round bobbles are knit into the placket and along the outer shoulders and sleeves of this jacket.

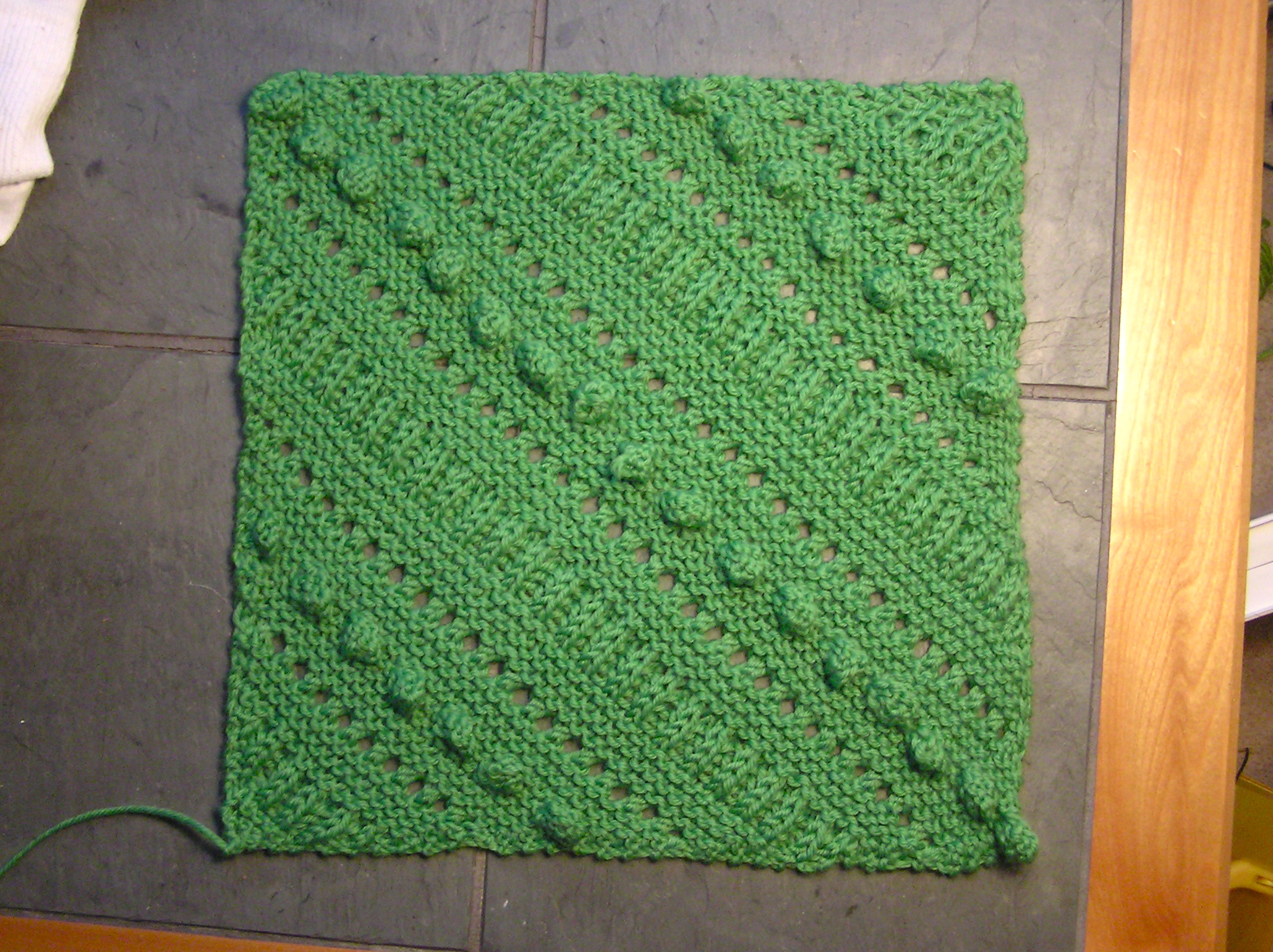
A close-up view of hand-knit bobbles

In knitting, a bobble is a localized set of stitches forming a raised bump. The bumps are usually arranged in a regular geometrical pattern (e.g., a hexagonal grid) or may be figurative, e.g., represent apples on a knitted tree.

The basic idea of a bobble is to increase into a single stitch, knit a few short rows, then decrease back to a single stitch. However, this leaves many choices: how to increase and how many stitches, how many short rows to work, and how to decrease.

A bobble can also be a yarn pom-pom used to decorate knitted items such as bobble hats.
