= Textiles of Mexico =

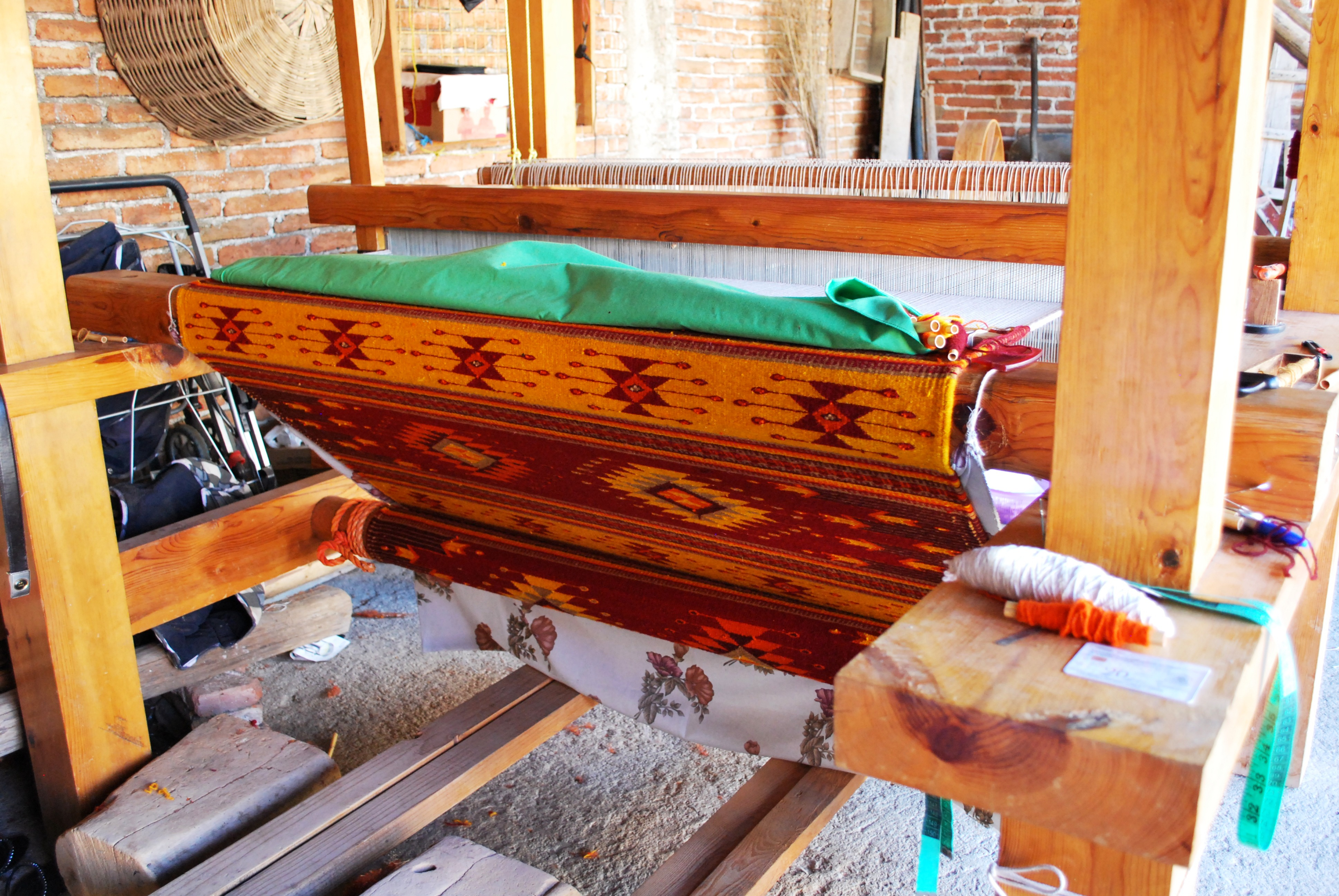
Rug in progress in Teotitlan del Valle, Oaxaca

The textiles of Mexico have a long history. The making of fibers, cloth and other textile goods has existed in the country since at least 1400 BCE. Fibers used during the pre-Hispanic period included those from the yucca, palm and maguey plants as well as the use of cotton in the hot lowlands of the south. After the Spanish conquest of the Aztec Empire, the Spanish introduced new fibers such as silk and wool as well as the European foot treadle loom. Clothing styles also changed radically. Fabric was produced exclusively in workshops or in the home until the era of Porfirio Díaz (1880s to 1910), when the mechanization of weaving was introduced, mostly by the French. Today, fabric, clothes and other textiles are both made by craftsmen and in factories. Handcrafted goods include pre-Hispanic clothing such as huipils and sarapes, which are often embroidered. Clothing, rugs and more are made with natural and naturally dyed fibers. Most handcrafts are produced by indigenous people, whose communities are concentrated in the center and south of the country in states such as Mexico State, Oaxaca and Chiapas. The textile industry remains important to the economy of Mexico although it has suffered a setback due to competition by cheaper goods produced in countries such as China, India and Vietnam.

== History ==
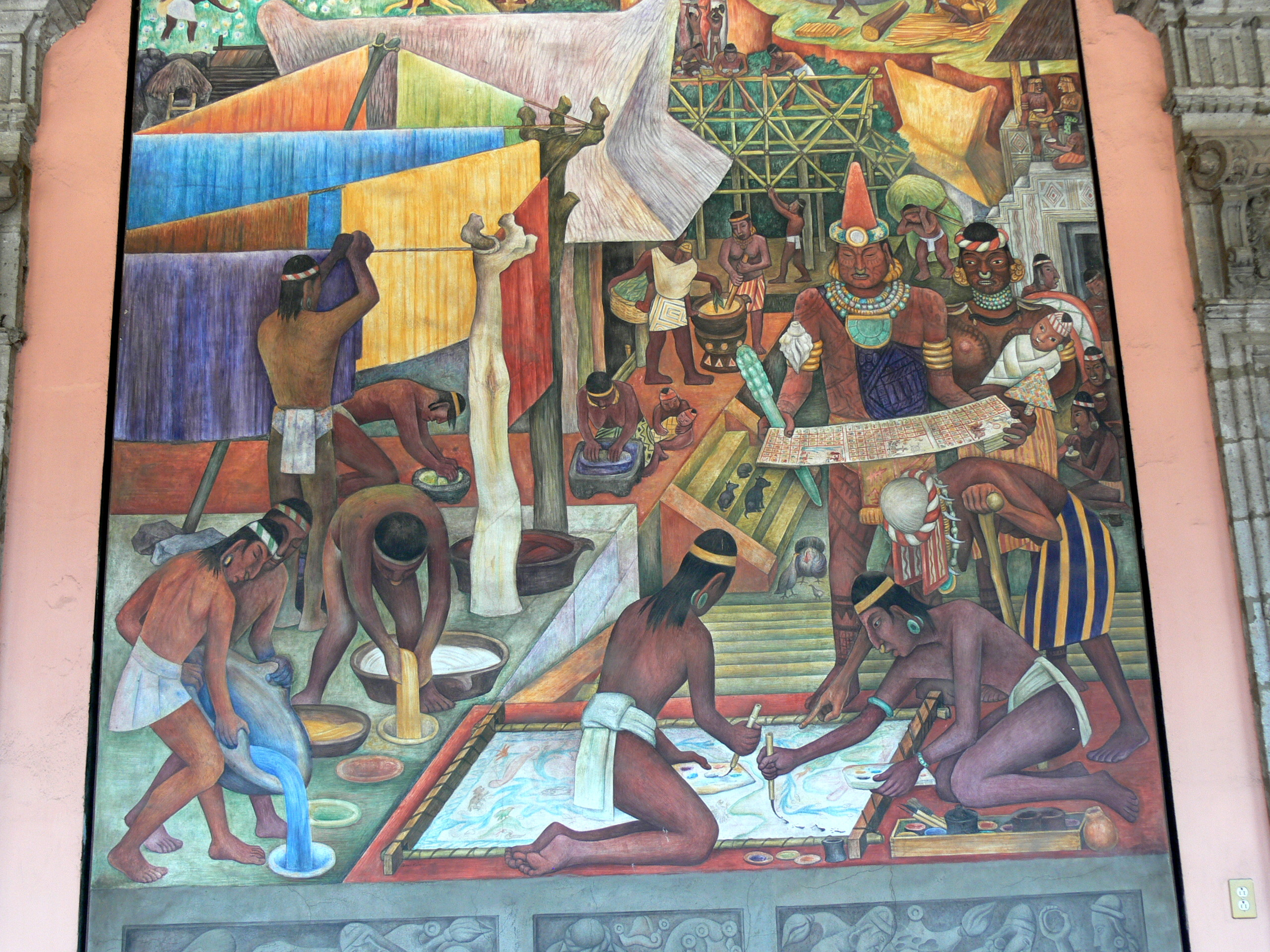
Diego Rivera mural depicting the making of textiles in the pre-Hispanic period

=== Pre-Hispanic period ===
The oldest known fabric fragments in Mexico have been found in the arid north of the country in states such as Coahuila, Chihuahua and Durango and date to approximately between 1800 and 1400 BCE. In pre-Hispanic times, the most common woven fibers in dry areas were from the yucca and palm trees, with cotton grown in the hot humid areas near the coast. It was unknown to the Aztecs until they conquered cotton growing areas and began demanding it as tribute. Then, only the upper classes were permitted to wear it. Given the important status cotton cloth had, it is often used as money. For some ceremonial garments, amate or bark paper was used.

Each of the sedentary Mesoamerican cultures had a god of weaving. Women were often buried with woven items they had made. Cortés mentions the Aztecs' skill in weaving in one of this letters to the king of Spain, in very favorable terms.

=== Colonial era ===
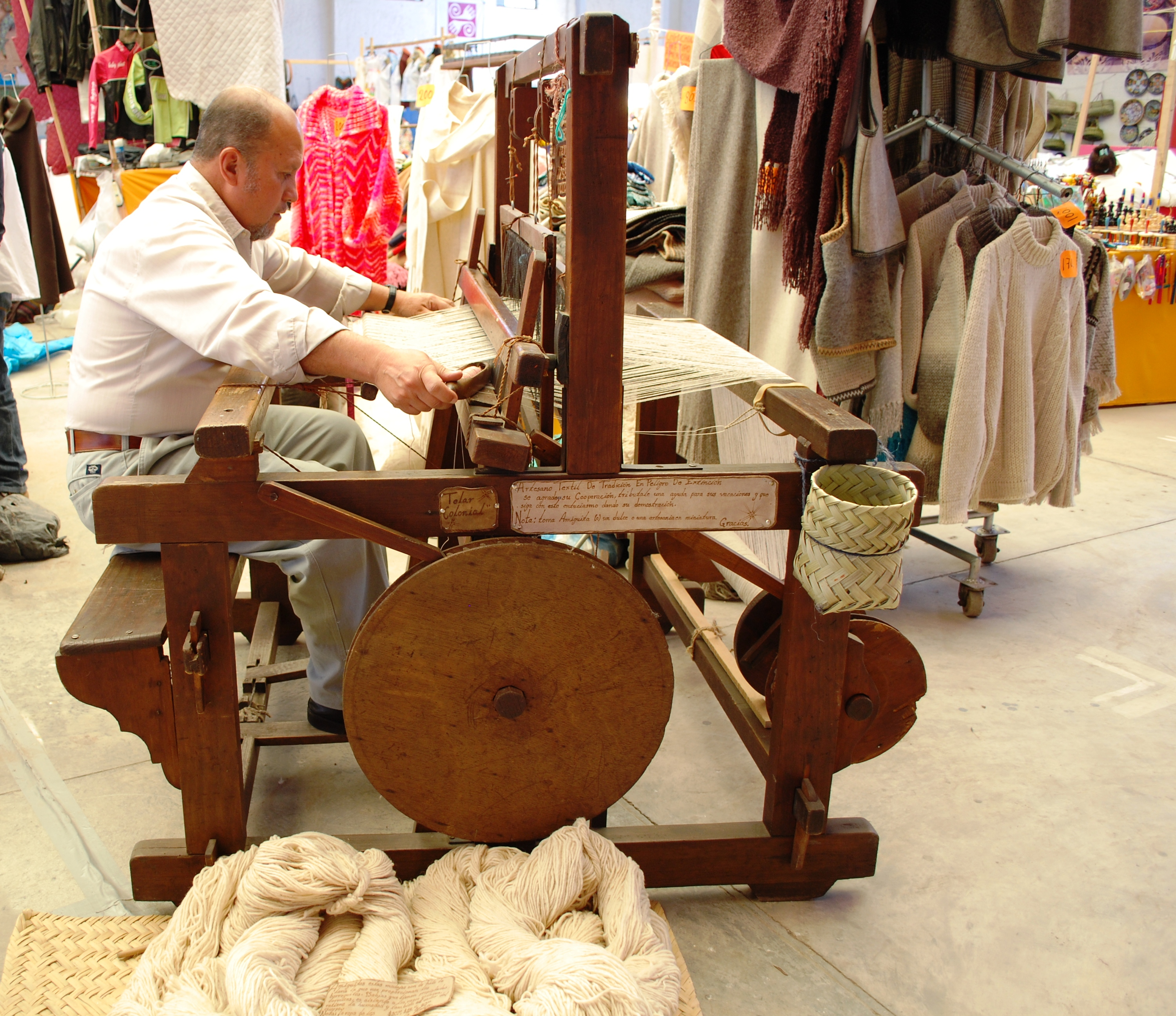
Weaver using foot treadle loom of the type introduced by the Spanish

After the Spanish conquest of the Aztec Empire, the production of cloth and the wearing of clothes in Mesoamerica changed drastically. Most pre-Hispanic forms of dress and body adornment were banned by the Spanish as "uncivilized." Indigenous, European and Asian fabrics influenced Mexican cloth production by the mid colonial period. The Spanish did not favor the native cotton, nor did they find the material produced on traditional backstrap looms wide enough. New techniques and materials were introduced. Spanish modes of dress, itself a mixture of European, Asia Minor and Egyptian influences, were introduced as well. At first wool and silk fabric was imported, then sheep and silkworms as well as European foot pedal looms all by the late 1530s. By 1580, Mexico had become one of the most productive areas for wool and silk cloth. Most of the production was concentrated in the present day states of Oaxaca, Tlaxcala and Puebla. At first Spanish weavers dominated production, but they were soon replaced by native weavers who were making material cheaper. Instead of prohibiting Indian made fabric, European weavers decided instead to hire them, creating workshops. While the indigenous weavers were not paid much, the Spanish owners did make money. These workshops eventually produced enough fabric for both internal consumption and for export to Spain, the Philippines, Central America and Peru. Silk cloth production was particularly dominant from 1540 to 1580; However, the end of this period, the yearly Manila Galleon was regularly bringing cheaper silk from Asia.

While cotton cloth was not favored by the Europeans, it was still made and offered as tribute to Spanish overlords. Commercializing the fiber was difficult as the plant grows in the lowlands near the oceans and not near the manufacturing areas in the highlands, and transportation costs were high. Large cotton weaving workshops were not founded until the second half of the 17th century. Eventually, the production of this fabric as well as wool fabric filled the gap left by the disappearance of Mexican silk fabric production. Wool fabric remained important because it was favored by the upper tiers of colonial society, and because sheep could be raised near major weaving areas, such as Puebla, Querétaro, Valladolid, Acámbaro, and San Miguel de Allende.

=== 19th century to present ===
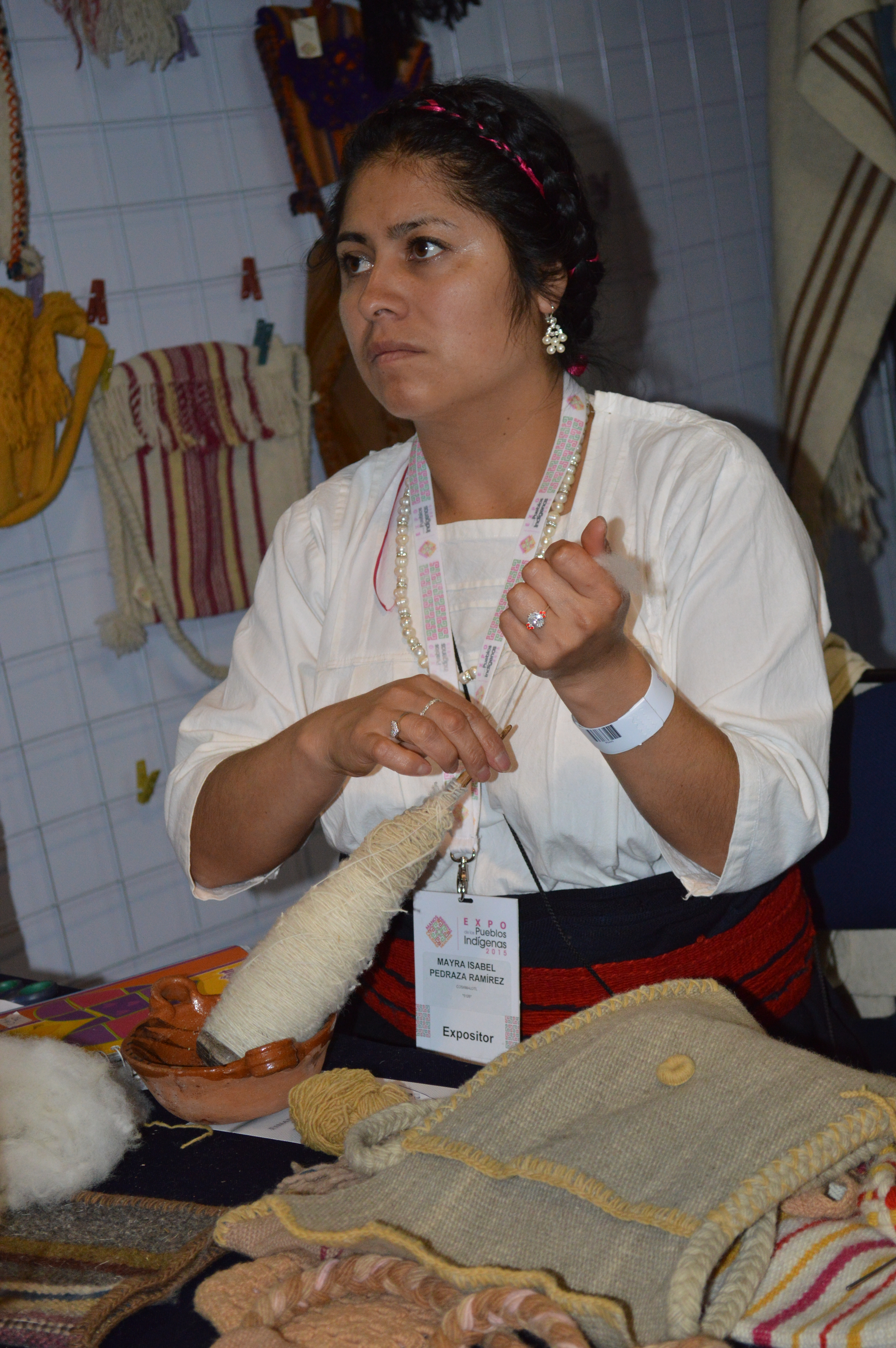
Spinning yarn using a pre Hispanic method

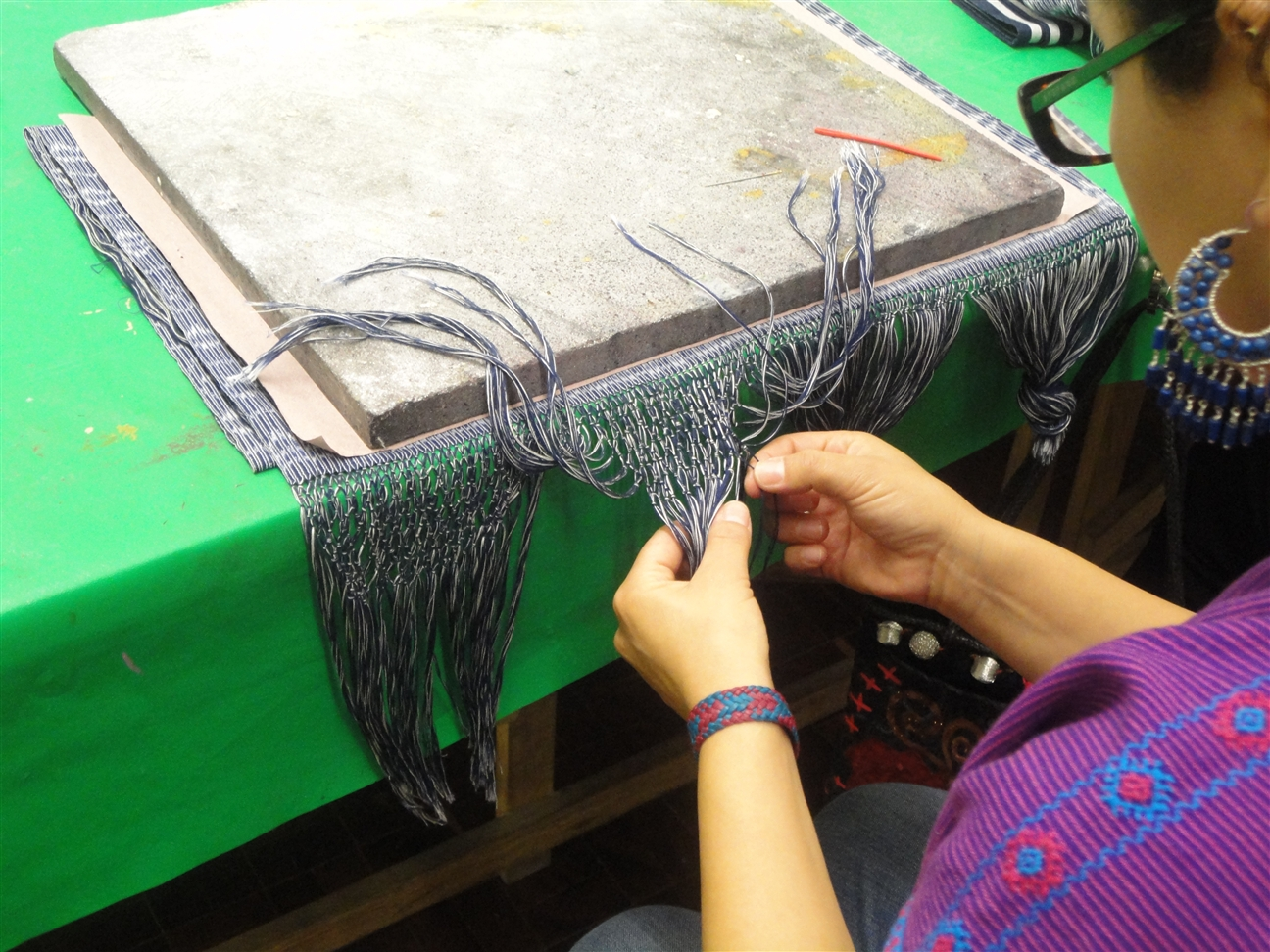
Finishing a rebozo wrap at a workshop at the Museo de Arte Popular, Mexico City.

In times past, fabric and clothing were made to last for decades, but today fabric is much cheaper and much of what clothing is bought is soon thrown away. This is mostly due to the mechanization of weaving, which has made fabric inexpensive. In Mexico, as in other parts of the world, the introduction of modern transportation and communications brought about major changes in the production and distribution of goods and in firms' management and structure. In the 19th century, industrialization affected textile production with the introduction of steam-powered machines and the efforts of French immigrants from Barcelonnette, who began to arrive in Mexico in the early 19th century. The mass production of textiles, especially cotton textiles, developed earlier than in other countries outside of Western Europe and the United States, nearing the same level as in England in the mid-18th century despite social unrest at that time. Mechanization of cloth production began in the 1830s; however, high internal taxes among states kept production facilities small and unconsolidated. While Mexican production lagged behind that of Europe, certain regions of the country such as La Laguna, in the modern states of Durango and Coahuila, became important producers of cotton fabric. The most widely produced fabric was called "manta," a natural cotton favored by many indigenous groups.

The development of steamship lines and railroad networks allowed Mexico-produced fabrics to be exported. The consolidation of power by Porfirio Díaz in the 1880s opened up business opportunities and made foreign investment possible. By the end of the 19th century, textile production and distribution was the country's largest manufacturing sector, mostly controlled by French immigrants. The immigrants worked together, forming the "Barcelonnette network." They started off with small textile mills and dry goods stores, which eventually grew into large factories and department stores, including Palacio de Hierro, which still exists. These French immigrants consolidated textile operations by the end of the 19th century, and by the start of the Mexican Revolution changed their power source from steam to electricity. They also changed textile mills from mostly family-owned organizations to more modern enterprises with professional managers and stock sold on exchanges.

The sewing machine appeared in the early 20th century and became widely used to join fabric and for embroidery. This led to another level of textile production: finished clothing.

== Craft and indigenous textiles today ==
=== Indigenous tradition ===
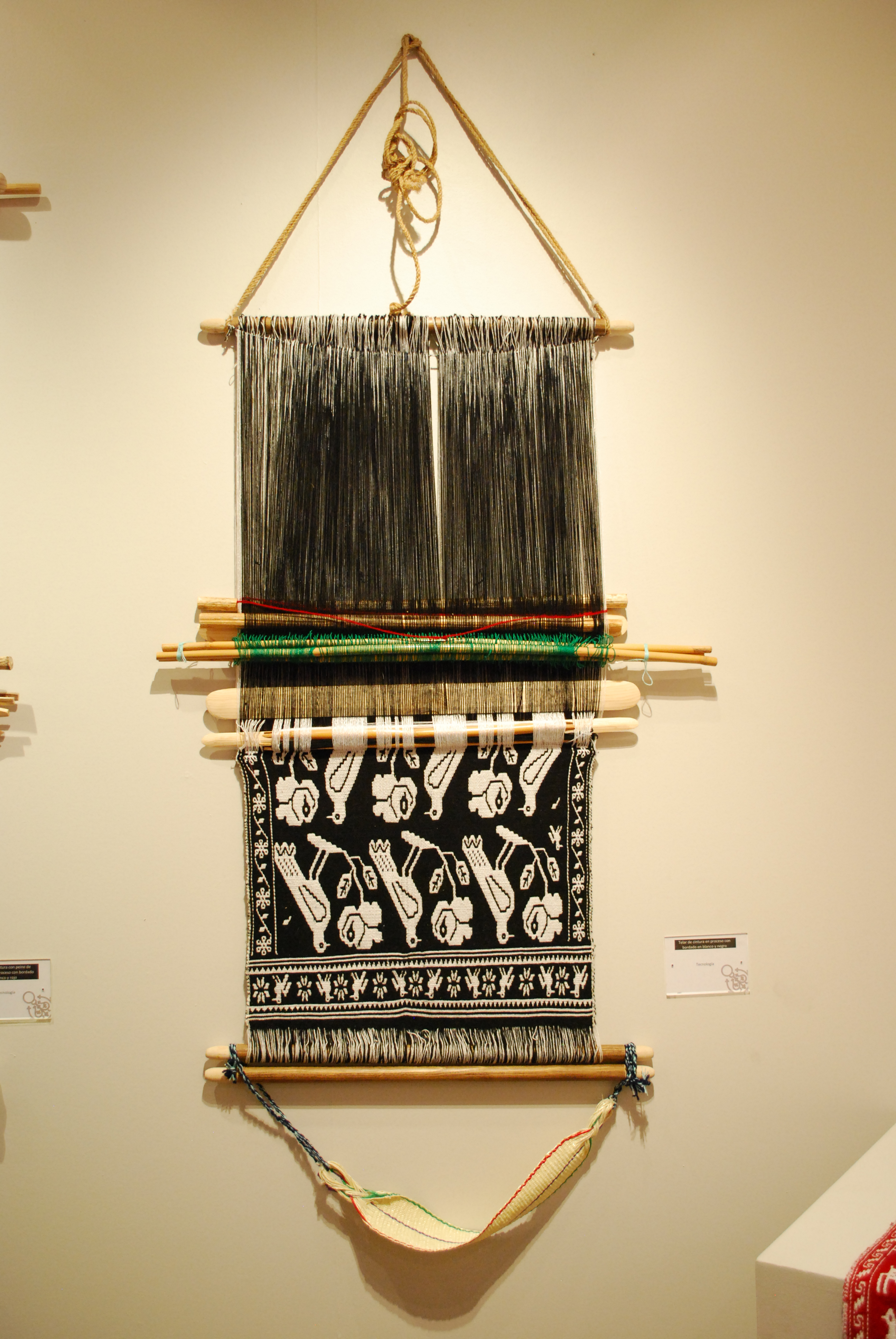
Cloth in progress on a backstrap loom from Hidalgo.

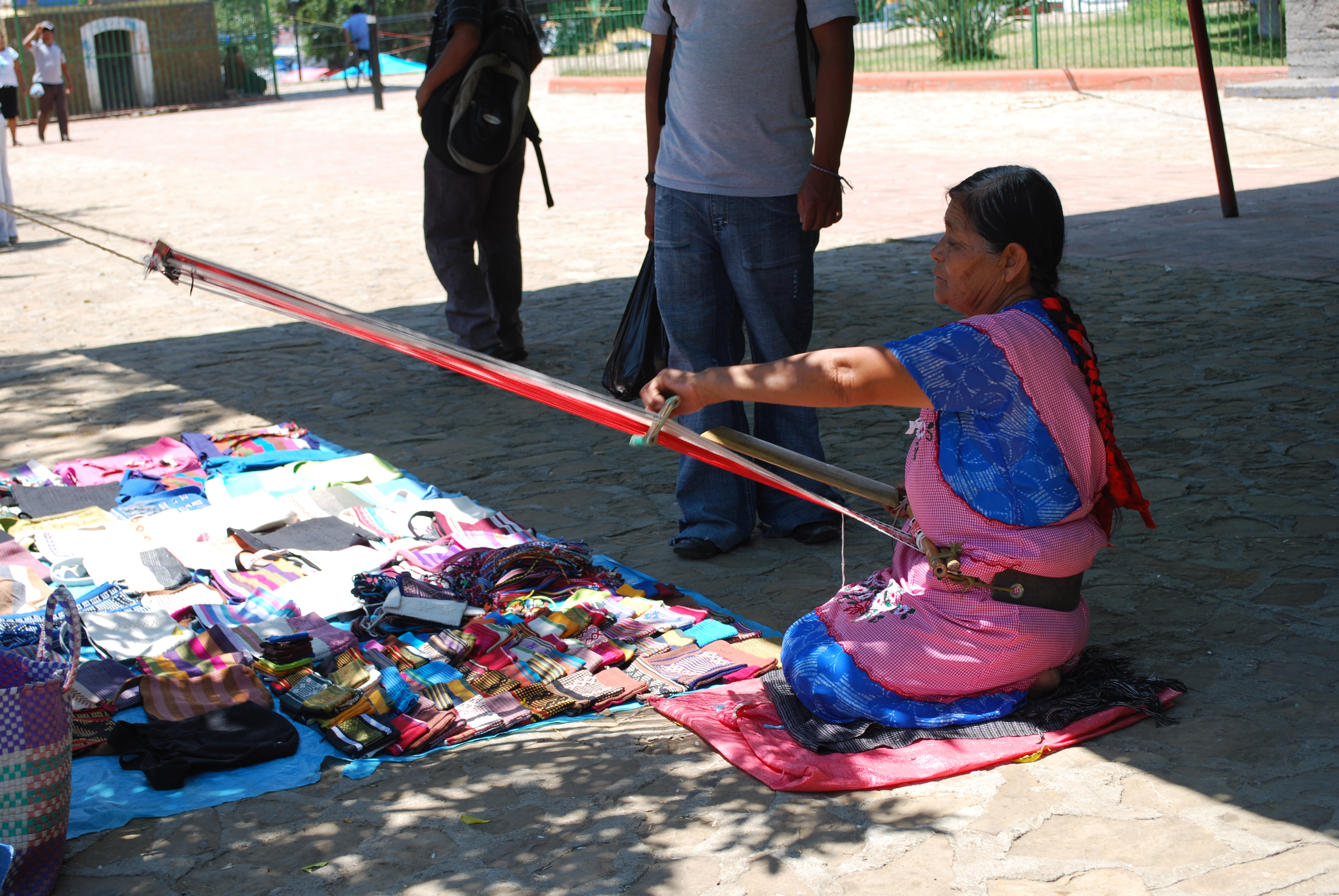
Woman in Zaachila, Oaxaca weaving with a backstrap loom

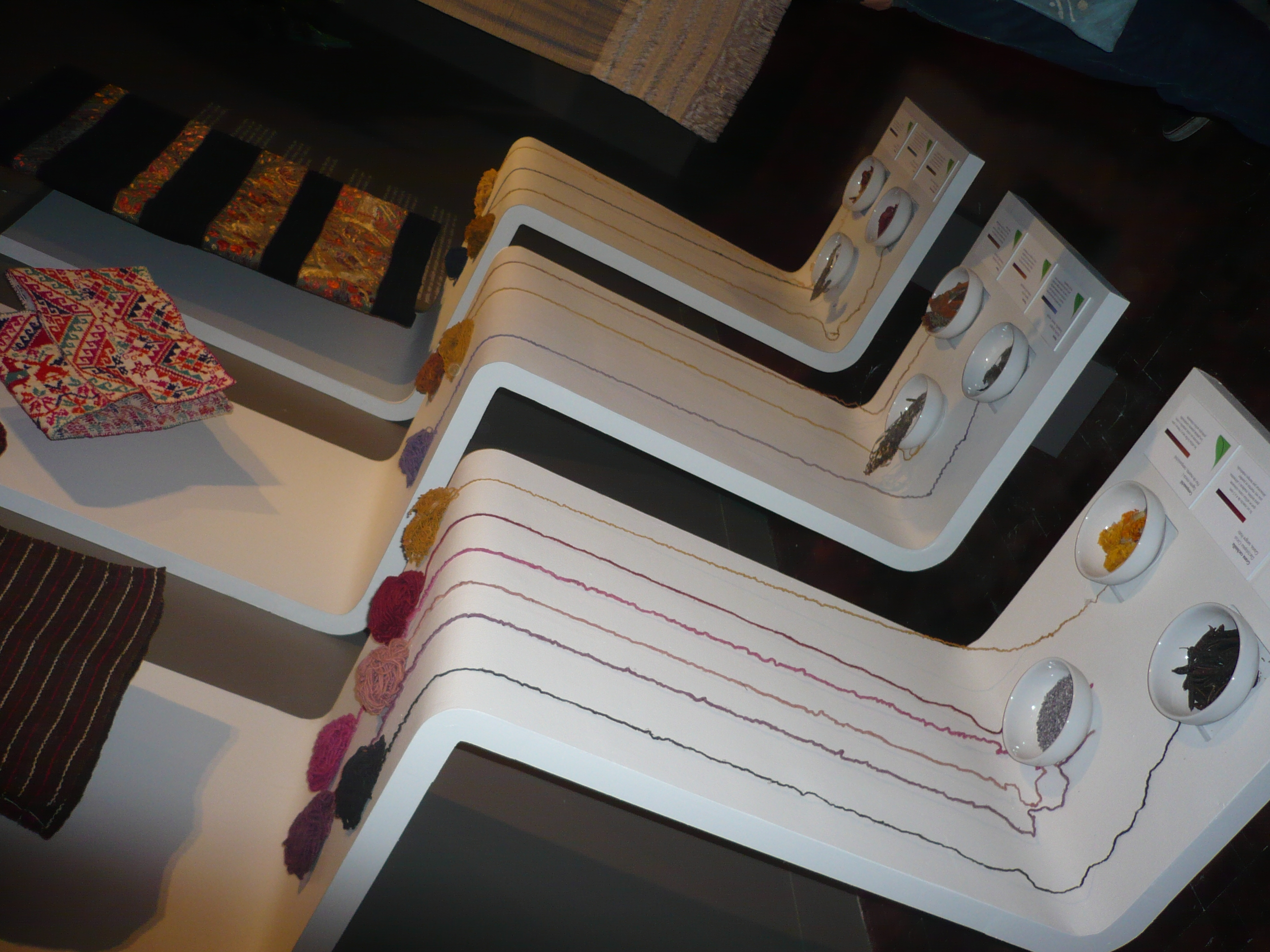
Exhibition of coloring with natural dyes at the "Bioartesanías" event at the Museo de Arte Popular.

Textiles is one of Mexico's more important crafts as it represents the continuation of tradition as well as its fusion with modern designs and techniques. Both pre-Hispanic and colonial era style textiles are still made in Mexico. In addition, many of the textile factories use machines based on old foot pedal looms from the colonial period. There are basically four types of fibers used for fabric production:

- Vegetable products such as cotton
- Animal products such as wool and silk
- Minerals such as gold and silver thread
- Synthetics

Raw materials for textiles fall into two groups: smooth fibers such as silk and wool, introduced to the American continent by the conquistadors; and hard fibers native to Mexico such as ixtle, lechuguilla, reeds, palm, twigs, cotton, and willow. In indigenous regions of Mexico, women are responsible for clothing the community, a process which often begins with harvesting natural fibers and then spinning, dyeing, and weaving textiles. In various parts of Mexico, both native backstrap looms and pedal-driven looms of European origin are used to weave principally cotton and wool.

Most handcrafted textiles are produced by the sixty or so indigenous ethnic groups in Mexico, who mostly live in rural areas in the center and south of the country. In these textiles, traditional indigenous designs, and in some cases techniques still survive. One common technique in craft fabric is brocade, which allows for raised designs to be woven into the cloth. Most indigenous textiles are made at home by women and used for clothing, home use, decorative use and ceremonial use. Items include those that are hand woven, hand embroidered, knitted and more. Clothing is one of the ways that these groups distinguish themselves from each other and the world at large. Some of these garments include the huipil, the quechquemitl, tilmas, sandals and rebozos. A number of ethnic groups, such as the Nahua in central Mexico commercialize their original and traditional creations as well as produce them for domestic consumption. People in coastal areas continue to plant cotton, spin it, dye it with natural elements such as indigo.

=== Indigenous clothing ===
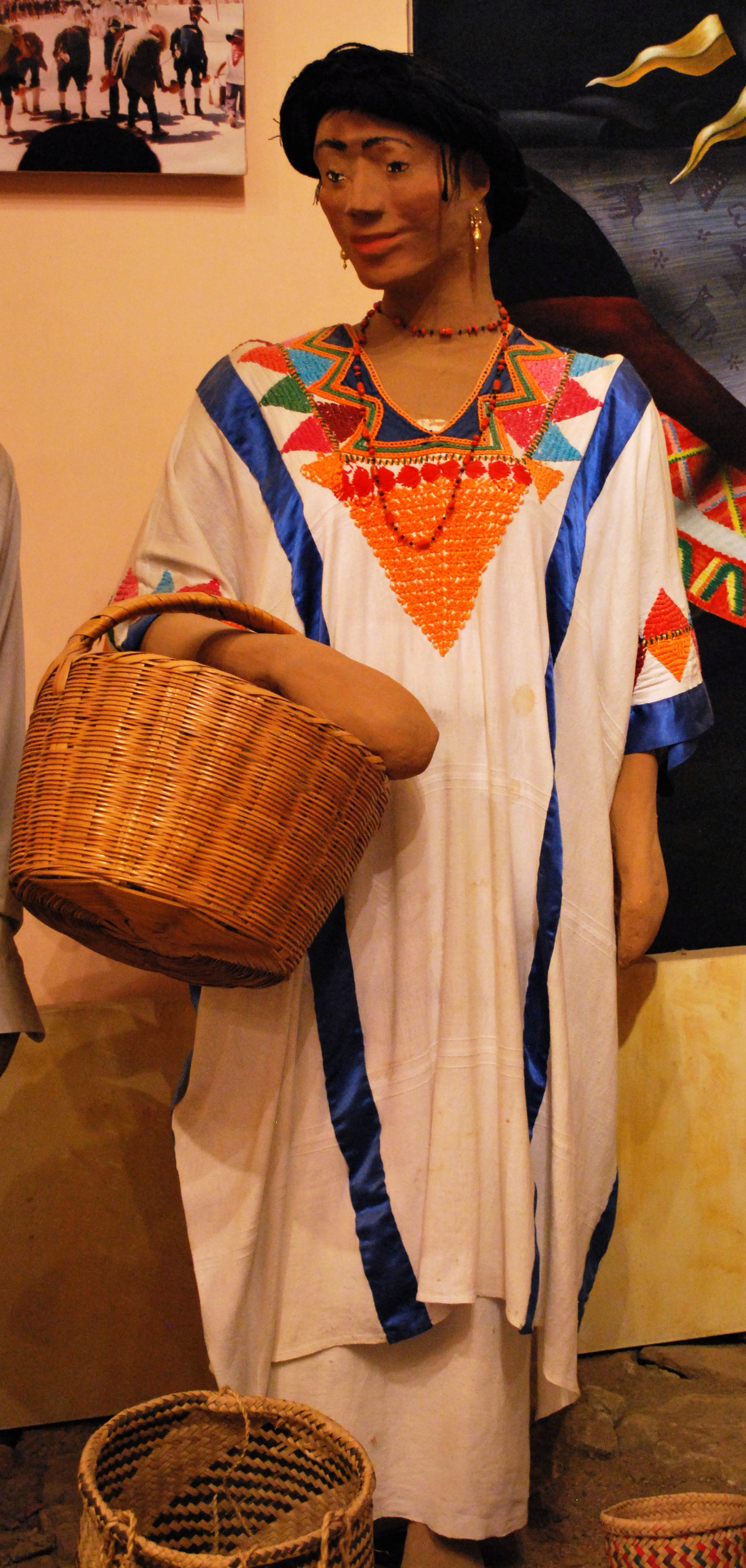
Huipil on display at the Regional Museum of Huajuapan.

Most of the pre-Hispanic clothing that survives is for women. These include "enredos", or wrap dresses, fajas, or cloth belts, huipils, a type of tunic, quechquemitl, which is a kind of rectangular or square short poncho. The last was originally worn directly on the upper body of a woman but today it is worn over a blouse. Loose-fitting sack dresses, called huipils in Oaxaca and guanengos in Michoacán, are often heavily embroidered with straight stitching, cross stitching and tucks with floral and geometric motifs.

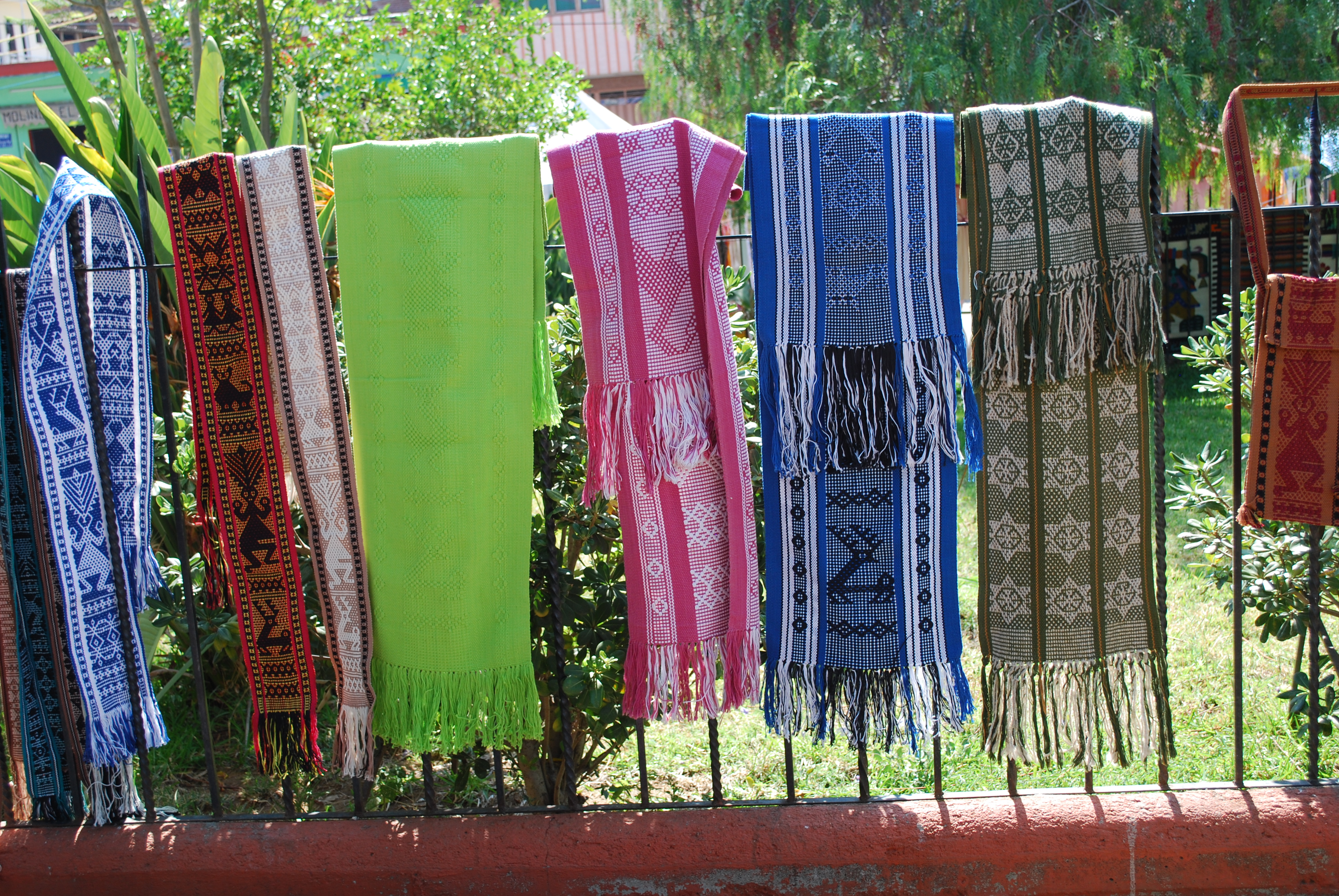
Rebozos and "fajas" or sash/belts for sale in Zaachila, Oaxaca

A widely used garment in both indigenous and mixed race communities is the rebozo. This is a long rectangular shawl used both as a wrap and as a means to carry children or heavy objects tied onto the body. The rebozo came about during the colonial period, not in the pre-Hispanic era. The rebozo is a synthesis of three historical influences, the pre-Hispanic "mámatl," the Spanish mantilla and the "repacejo," an Oriental garment. This is a long rectangular piece of cloth with long fringes at both ends. Most rebozos are made with multicolored designs woven into the pieces using threads of different colors. Those of a single color are usually made of yarn or thread that has been tie-dyed to produce color variations in the final piece. This latter style is called "jaspe" or jasper and are usually woven on backstrap looms.

The rebozo has been produced mostly in central Mexico since the colonial period, with some of the best known producers in Mexico State and Michoacan. Tenancingo is one of the best known producers of craft rebozos, usually made of cotton but wool is also used. Traditional rebozos in the Lake Pátzcuaro area are often of white and blue over a black background and may be embroidered in tiny cross stitch.

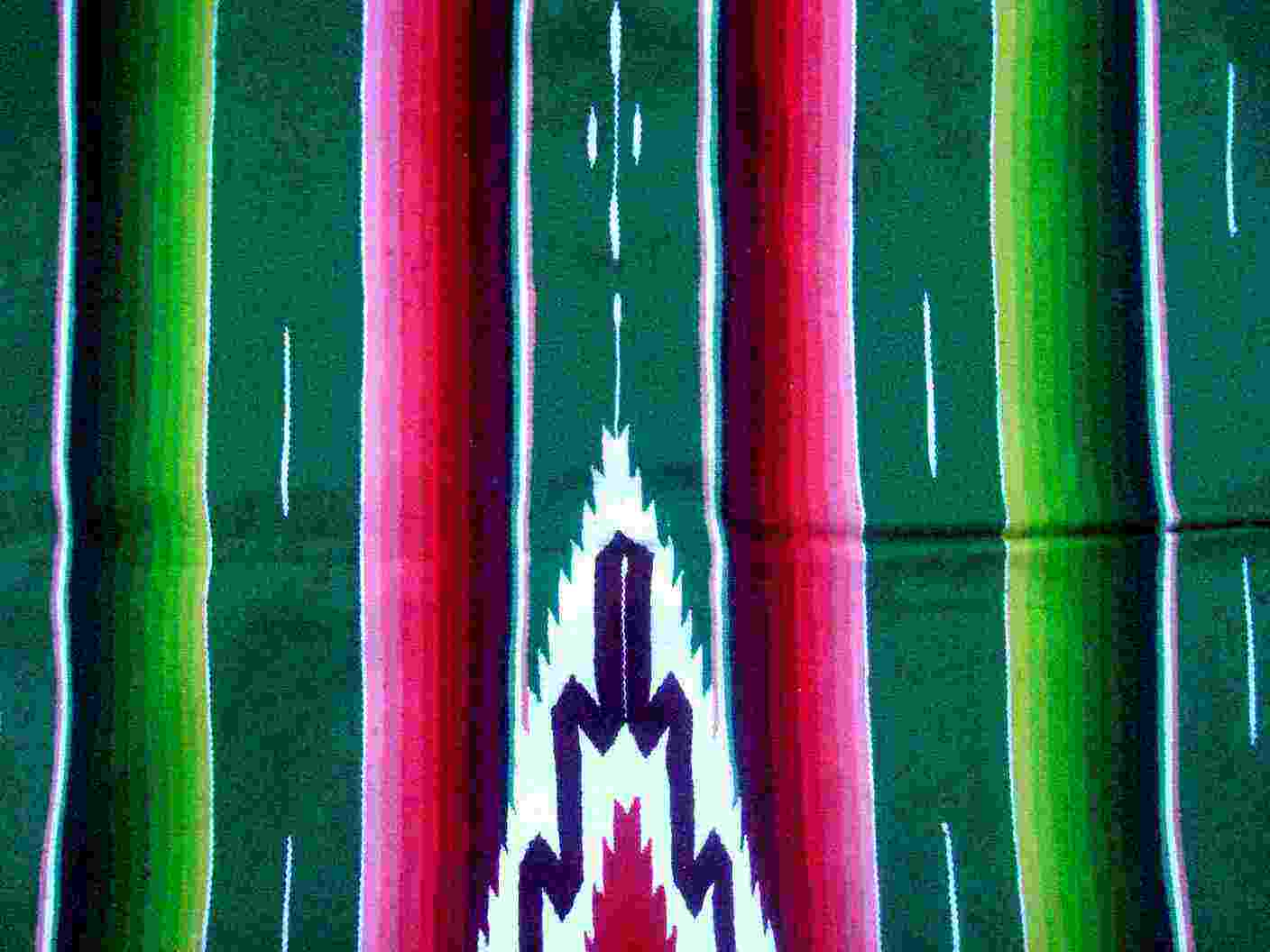
Portion of a sarape

Few pre-Hispanic male clothing pieces survive since many Mesoamerican males went about nude or semi nude, causing Spanish authorities to force them to adopt European shirts and pants early. This early colonial style shirts and pants have changed little in indigenous communities and are now identified with indigenous groups, especially the Tarahumara in Chihuahua, the Tacuates in Oaxaca and the Tzeltals in Chiapas. Many male garments are heavily embroidered in multiple colors. Since indigenous pants lack pockets, many men carry decorated bags called morrals. The only pre-Hispanic male garment to survive is the sarape, which is used only in certain areas of Mexico.

In addition to clothing, other items are woven such as bedspreads, blankets, hats, cinches and knapsacks. The designs for these are most often woven into the fabric itself, but embroidered stars, border designs, deer, and other can be seen as well. These items may be made with various fibers include those derived from the maguey plant.

=== Embroidery ===
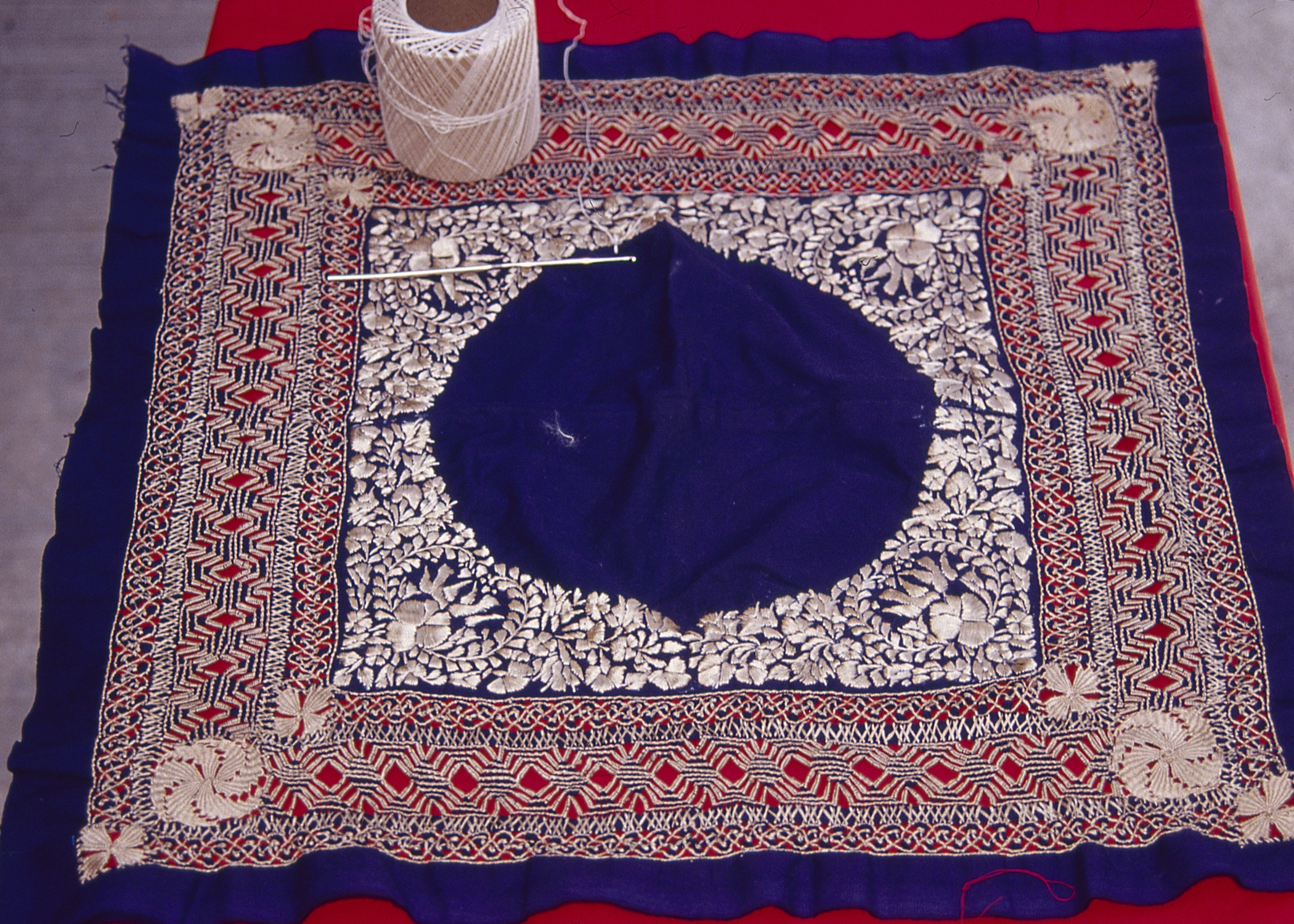
Embroidered panel by Virginia Sanchez de Cornelio of Oaxaca

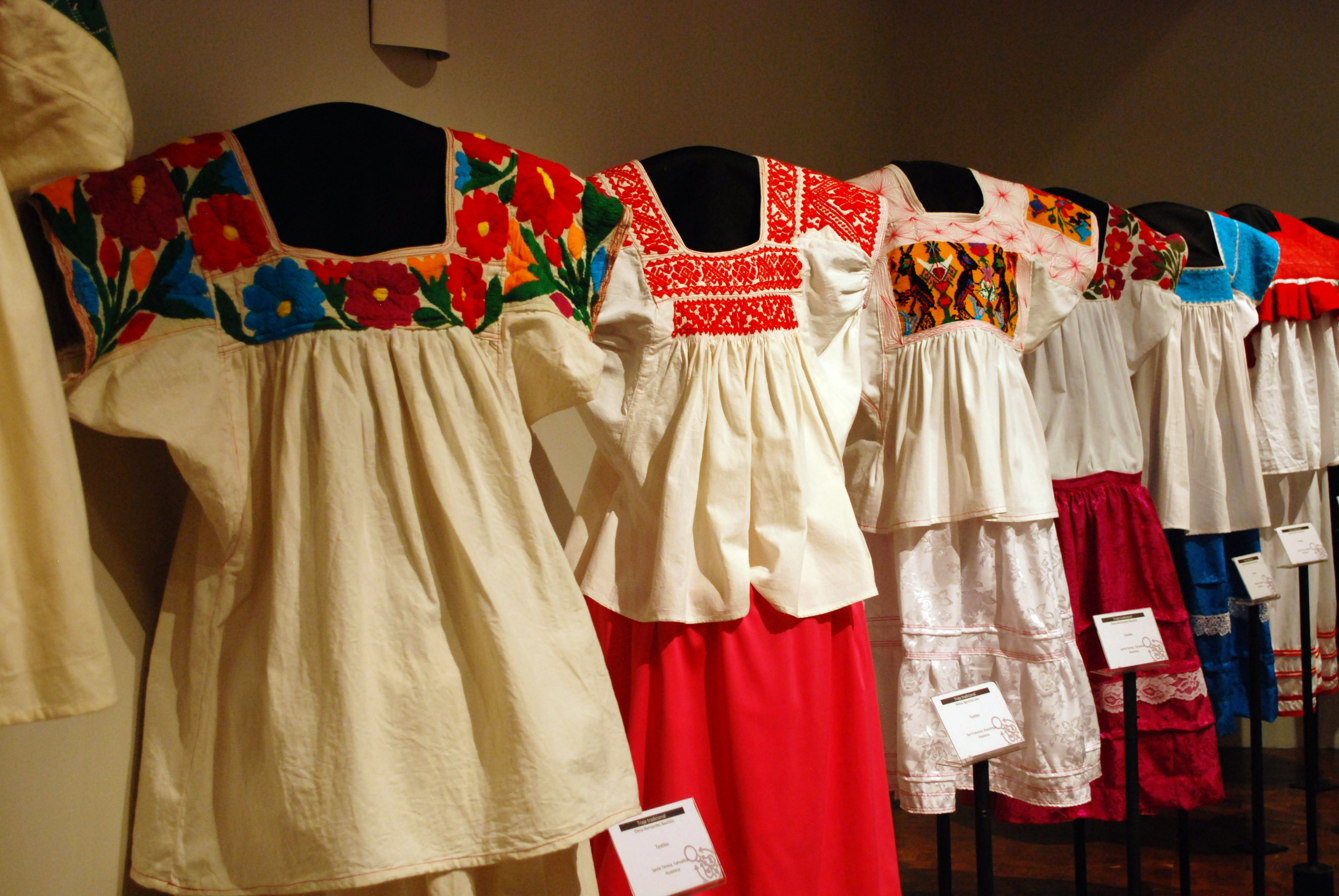
Embroidered blouses from the La Huasteca region of Hidalgo.

One of the most distinctive aspects of indigenous handcrafted textiles is the use of embroidery. Indigenous motifs found on garments range from geometric patterns, zig-zag, spirals, moons, crosses and stepped frets. Thin cloth belts that wrap around the waist (fajillas) are common in a number of indigenous groups and are richly embroidered. The borders are often adorned with zig-zag edging, such as those of the Huichols. The Otomis use a moon pattern on these belts along with their morrals or carrying bags, and the Tarahumara tend to decorate theirs with triangular designs. Many of the embroidery patterns of the huipils in Oaxaca, also show pre-Hispanic influence. Flower designs are popular for embroidering women's clothing among the Otomis, Nahuas, Huastecs, Huichols and others. Spirals and curved designs appear with frequency especially in the center and south of the country.

In addition to flowers, other themes from nature in woven and embroidered designs include plants, animals such as squirrels, rabbits, deer, armadillos, doves, hummingbirds, pelicans, seagulls and fish. Mazahua embroidered belts are known for their zoomorphic designs and those of Santo Tomás Jalieza tend to have images of large plumed birds. The cloth napkins of San Mateo del Mar have images of aquatic birds such as pelicans and seagulls, with those of the Tacuates of Santiago Zacatepec have borders with many diminutive animals such as centipedes, scorpions, birds, iguanas, cats, foxes and more.

Human figures appear with relative frequency as well. They feature prominently on the embroidered napkins of San Juan Colorado and as Danza de la Pluma dancers on the cloth belts of Santo Tomás Jalieza. Patriotic symbols such as two-headed eagles, the three colors of the Mexican flag and the eagle with serpent crest. These are most prevalent in the central region of the country among the Otomis, Nahuas, Huastecos, Huicholes and others. Christian symbols such as the cross, virgins, saints, angels and other elements were introduced by evangelists in the early colonial period. These appear on small and large pieces such as men's shirts among the Tzotzil in Chiapas, in the fabrics of San Miguel Ameyalco, which feature churches, and the appearance of the Virgin of Guadalupe in many textiles in the Sierra Norte of Puebla.

Popular sayings or phrases also appear especially in the textiles of the Purépecha around Lake Pátzcuaro and in the state of Puebla.

=== Looms ===
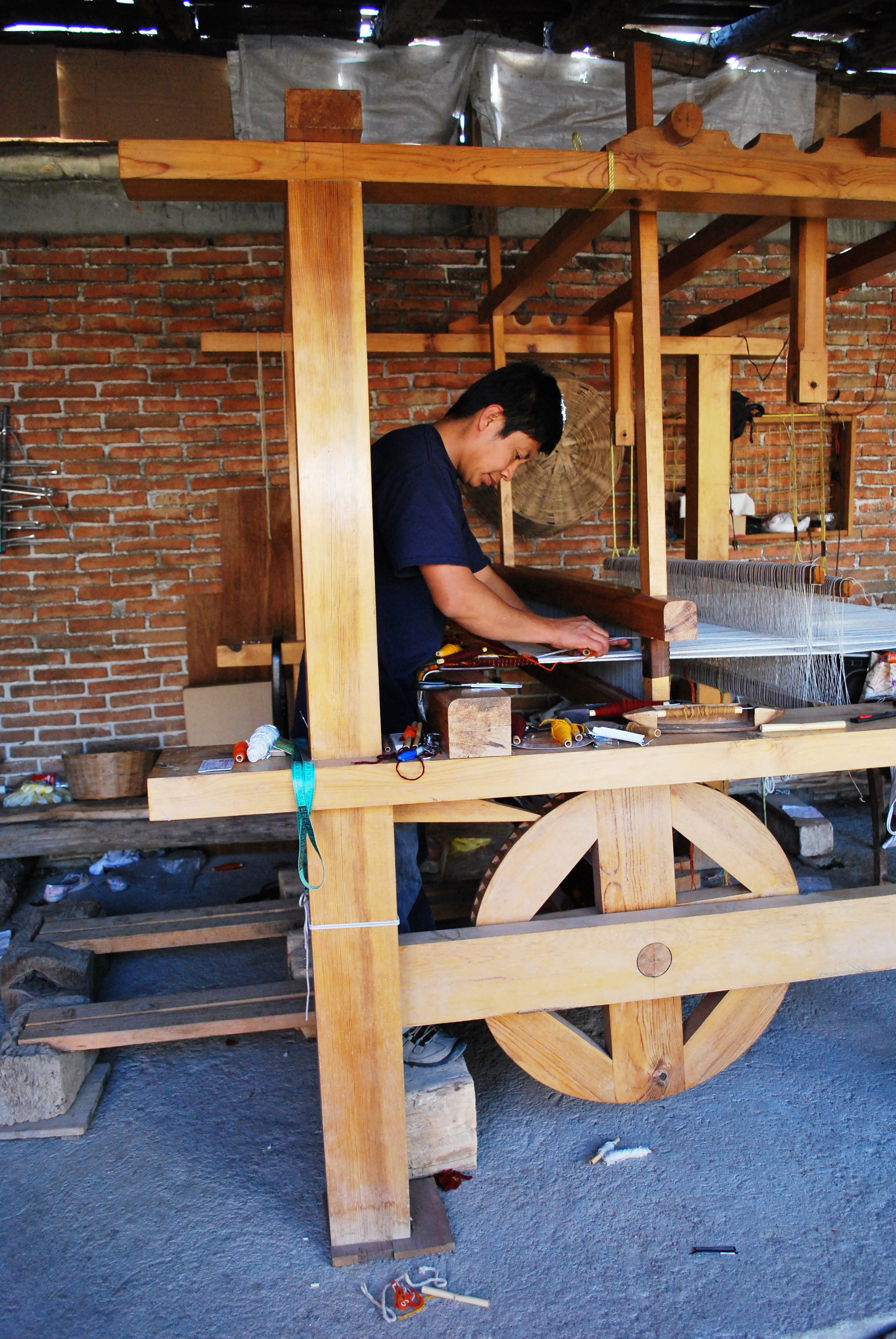
Man working on treadle loom in Teotitlan del Valle, Oaxaca

Two types of looms are employed in the making are handcrafted fabrics, the pre-Hispanic backstrap loom and the introduced European foot pedal loom. Traditionally, weaving, especially on the backstrap loom, was considered to be women's work. Women still produce items such as kitchen cloths, tablecloths, carrying bags and ornamental items with traditional designs. Although considered primitive, the backstrap loom is versatile and allows for different techniques and combinations of techniques, some of which can be very complicated. It allows for the combining of different fibers such as cotton with wool or silk. Designs are woven into the cloth on this loom by changing thread colors and/or by adding items such as shells or other matter into the finished product. The backstrap loom is most prevalent in the south of the country.

The foot pedal loom was brought to Mexico after the Conquest. Unlike pieces done on backstrap looms, pieces done on these machines have traditionally been done by men with wool being the favored fiber. This type of loom is most extensively used in the center and north of the country. The principal advantage of this loom is that it allows for pieces of greater width than backstrap looms and has been used to create sarapes, rugs, blankets and more.

=== Rugs and other items made in Oaxaca and Mexico State ===
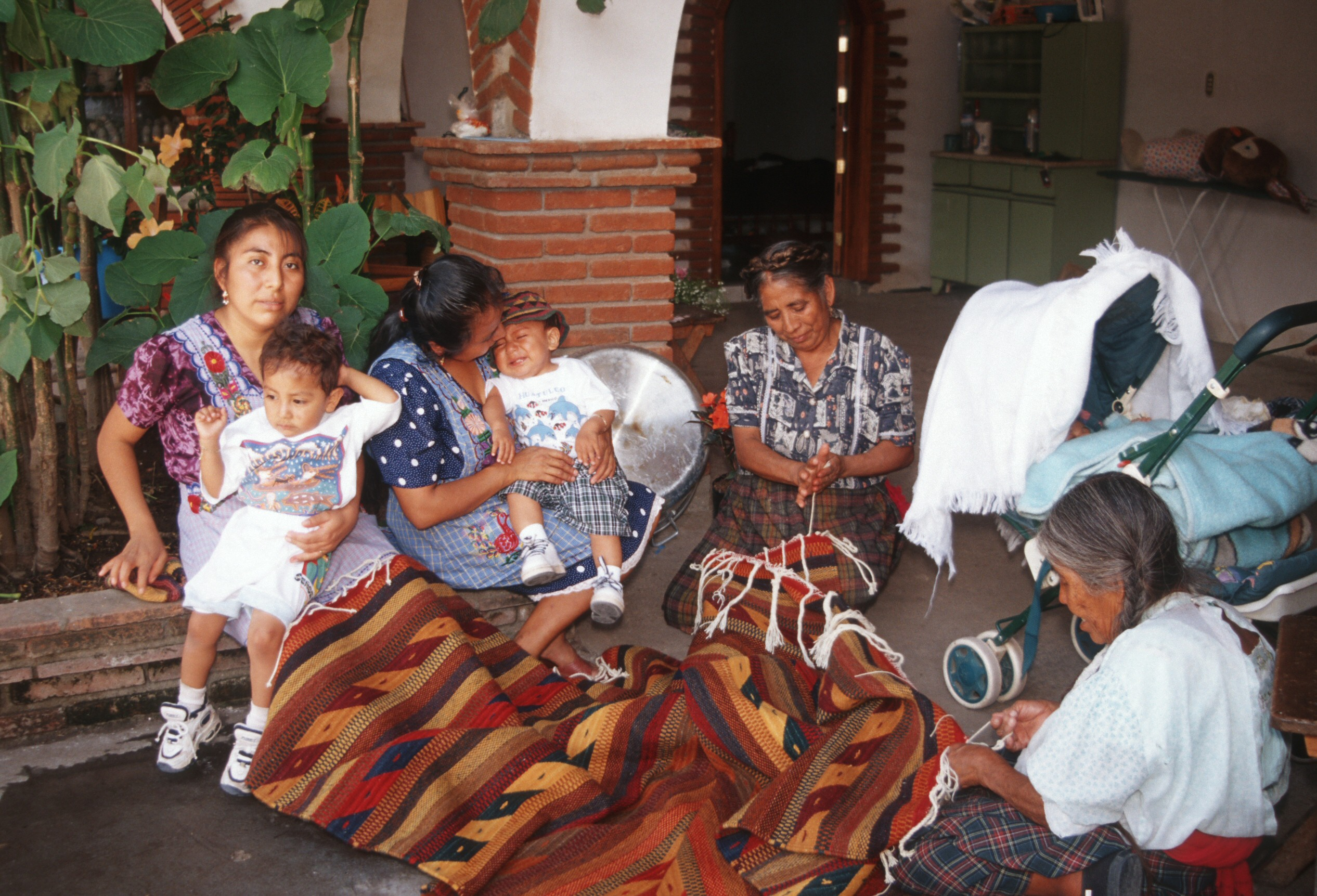
Bulmaro Perez Mendoza family finishing off a rug

Two states that continue to have significant handcrafted textile production are Oaxaca and Mexico State. Oaxaca is known for its variety of handcrafted textiles including rugs, rebozos, tablecloths and traditional clothing such as huipils. These are made backstrap looms or foot pedal looms. In Mexico State craft pieces are mostly produced in Jiquipilco, Tejupilco de Hidalgo, Temascaltepec de González, Temoaya, Valle de Bravo, Zacazonapan, Toluca and Tenancingo producing napkins, tablecloths, sheets, kitchen items, clothing, bathroom items, rebozos and rugs.

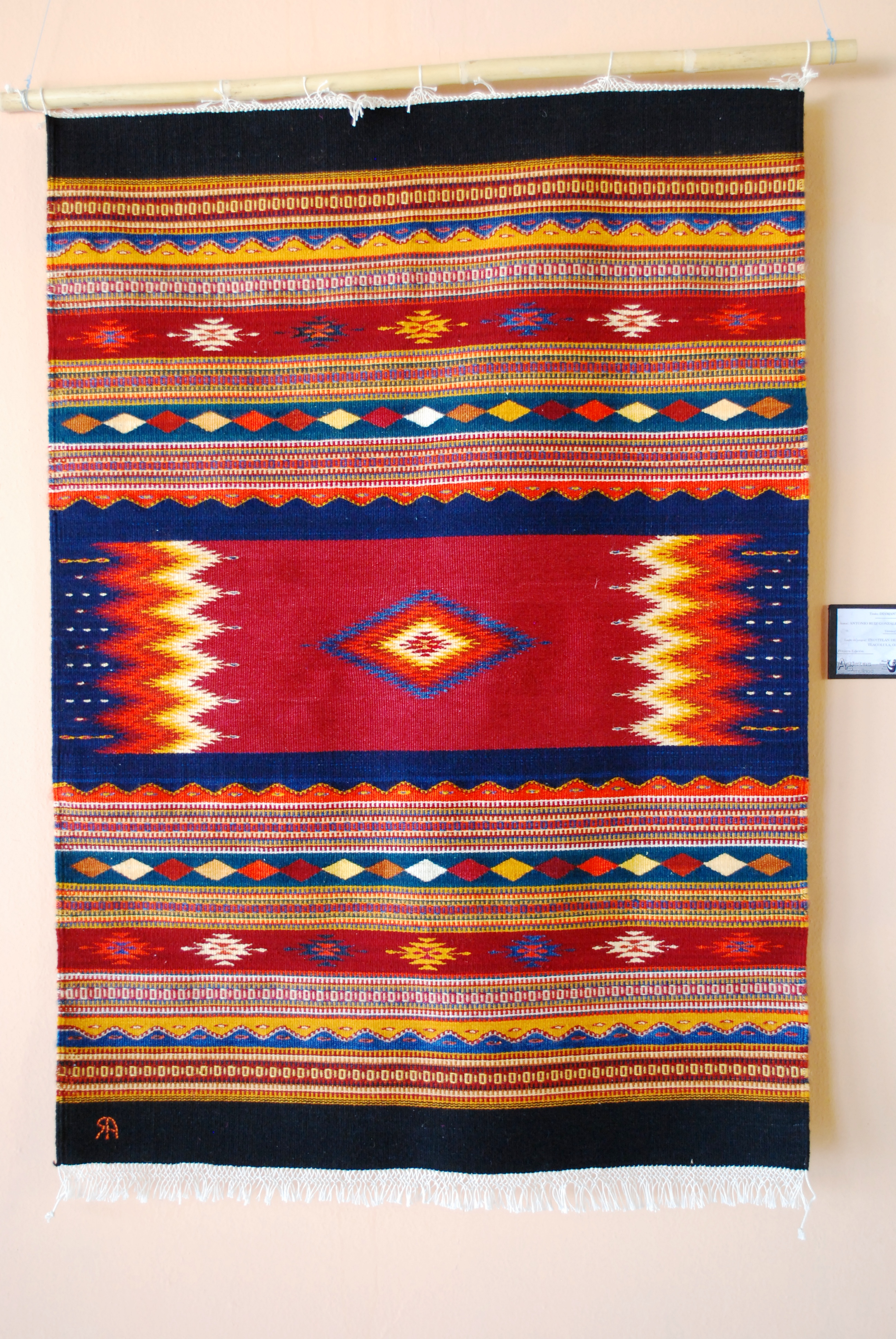
"Diamante Ojo de Dios" by Antonio Ruiz Gonzalez of Teotitlan del Valle at Museo Estatal de Arte Popular de Oaxaca

Both states also are significant producers of rugs. The making of knotted rugs by the Otomi in Mexico State is relatively recent. It began in 1969 when Ernesto Fernández Hurtado of the Bank of Mexico decided to promote a pilot center in Temoaya for the study and manufacture of this type of rug using traditional Otomi designs. Today, these rugs are a distinctive feature in Mexico State crafts. The rugs are made with 100% virgin wool and have an average knot density of 140,000 m2. There are about 21 different designs offered with 250 variations in colors and size. Most are sold in upper-class neighborhoods of Mexico City, but due to the problem of cheap imitations, some vendors only sell from their workshops.

Teotitlán del Valle in Oaxaca is known for its woven rugs. Most producers make their rugs on foot pedal looms using wool dyed with natural materials such as indigo and the cochineal bug. Rugs are also produced in Mitla, Santa Ana del Valle and Tlacolula de Matamoros along with blankets and a type of sarape. One distinguishing feature of Oaxaca rug production is the use of the cochineal insect. This insect has been used since pre-Hispanic times to dye fiber, producing colors ranging from purple to yellow, varying depending on what the ingredients, such as certain flowers or lime juice, are added. For a time, the use of natural dyes was threatened by cheaper synthetics but the use of natural dyes has made a comeback.

=== Value and protection of handcrafted textiles ===
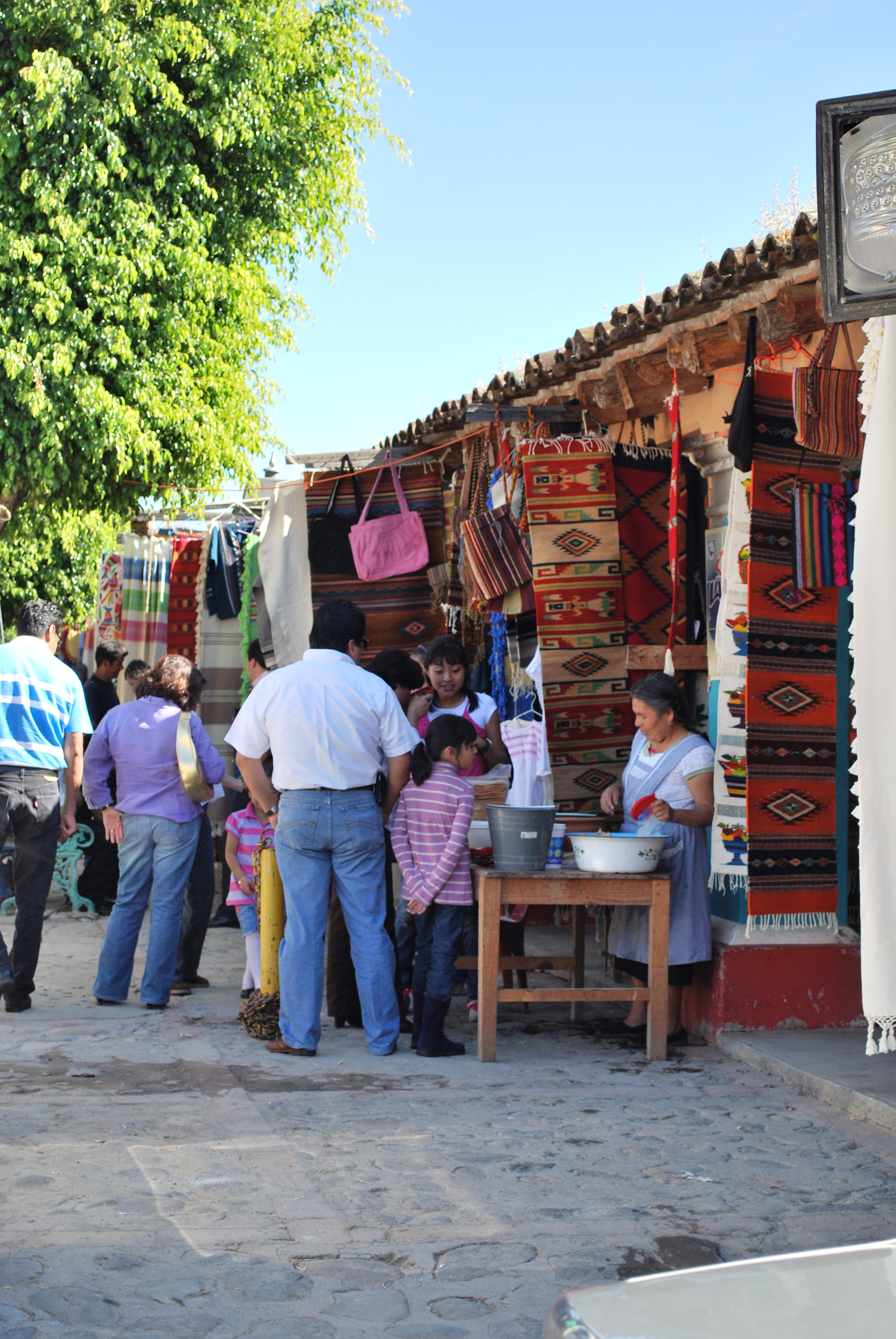
Rugs and other textiles for sale in Teotitlan del Valle, Oaxaca

After the Mexican Revolution, references to native Mexican cultures became fashionable, including arts, crafts, food, and regional clothing. This was expressed in the arts by those such as Diego Rivera and Dr. Atl. Since that time, there have been a number of efforts to maintain and expand the textile producing traditions, especially of the south of Mexico. The Textile Museum has a collection of 4,000 pieces and is located in the former monastery of San Pablo in the city of Oaxaca. The museum was opened in 2008 and sponsored by the Alfredo Harp Helú Foundation. The pieces include modern, colonial and pre-Hispanic textiles. Clothing items include huipils, enredos, quechquemilts, skirts, rugs and wall hangings. The collection is in three divisions Textiles of Oaxaca, Textiles of Mexico and Textiles of the World.

Sna' Jolobil, or House of the Textiles in the Tzotzil language, is a cooperative of more than 600 Tzotzil and Tzeltal women in 12 municipalities in Chiapas based in San Cristóbal de las Casas. It was founded to promote and elevate the textile crafts, especially those produced on backstrap looms, with the aim of preserving traditional techniques and designs as well as promoting the economic fortunes of women weavers. The organization has a collection of antique huipils available for study and reproduction as well as workshops in weaving and producing vegetable dyes. The organization has been successful in attracting more young people into the craft. In 1986, it received the Premio Nacional de Ciencias y Artes (National Prize of Sciences and the Artes) and numerous members have earned individual awards for their work.

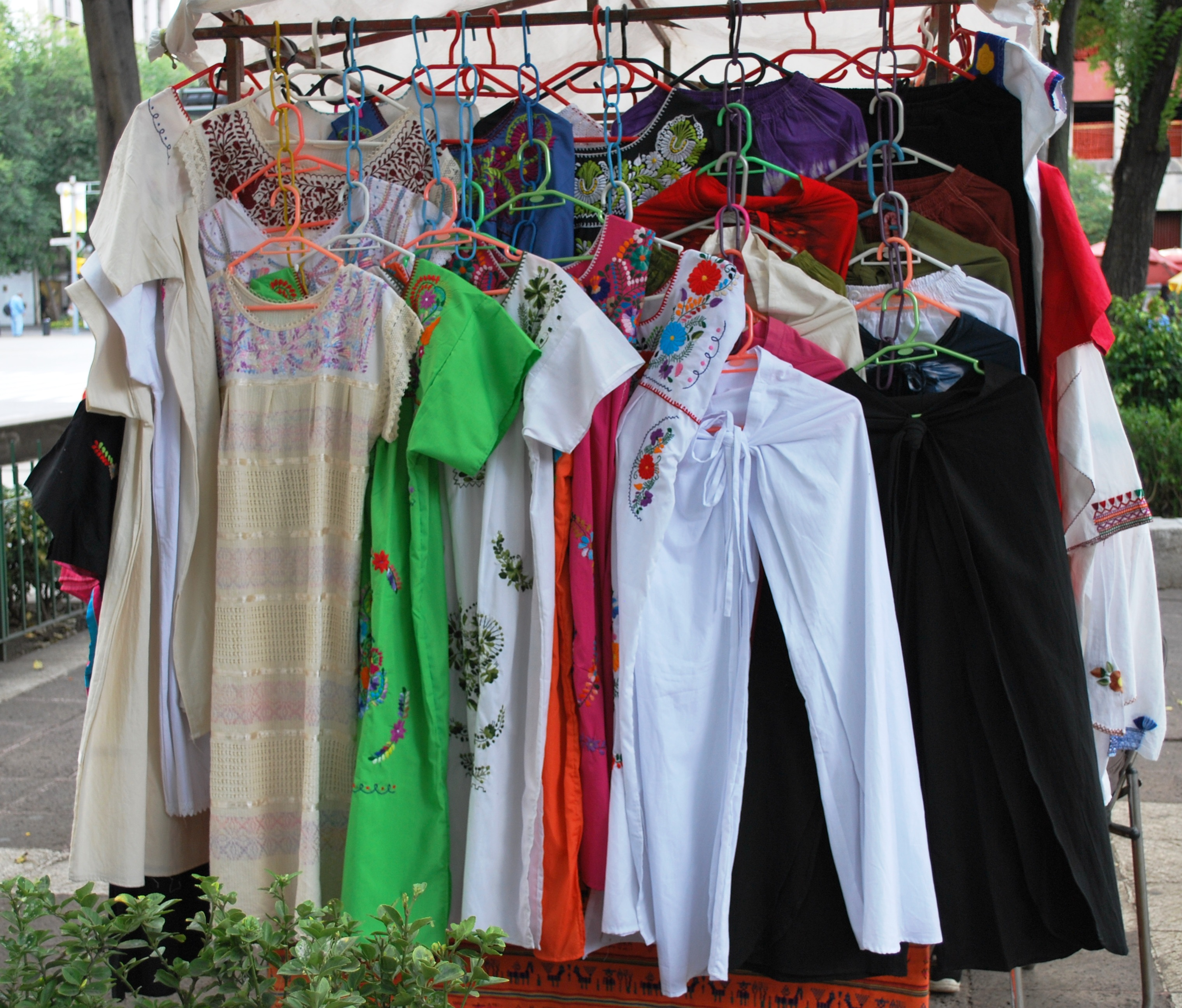
Traditional clothing for sale on a sidewalk in Mexico City

Federal agencies such as FONART and various state agencies have their own promotional efforts including annual crafts contests and the recognition of masters in various fields, including textiles. Florentina López de Jesús is an Amusgo from Xochistlahuaca, Guerrero. She learned to weave from her mother at six years of age as well as to prepare raw cotton and spin it into yarn. She continued to weave as well as to do other jobs to help out her family. As an adult she began to make pieces specifically for sale such as tablecloths, placemats, rebozos and huipils, traveling to Ometepec to market. Her work caught the attention of FONART in between 1969 and 1971, which led to her becoming a member of the La Flor de Xochistlahuaca artisans' cooperative. Since then, she has given workshops to people in her region as well as the Curso de Tintes Naturales sobre Algodon (Natural Dyes for Cotton Course) in 1994 and has promoted the use of brown cotton called "coyochi." Her work has won a number of awards including 2nd place Gran Premio de Arte Popular, FONART in 1987, 1st place Gran Premio de Arte Popular, FONART in 1991 and Premio Nacional de Artesanias de SECOFI in 1993.

Juan Rayón Salinas, whose parents were craftsmen, is from Mexico State. He began working with textiles in 1970, and in 1971 the state government began work to open a Centro de Capacitación de Tapiz y de Bajo Liso to introduce European techniques for making rugs. Traditionally Rayón's hometown of Xonacatlán made wool sarapes, but he entered the center specializing in throw rugs. He work was recognized and he began to participate in exhibitions in Mexico and abroad. After working for a time with the Centro, he established his own independent workshop. His work can be seen in various cities in Mexico as well as in New York. Also from Xonacatlán, Reyna Rayón Salinas is known for her cloth belts and embroidery, which she has been making since she was 12.

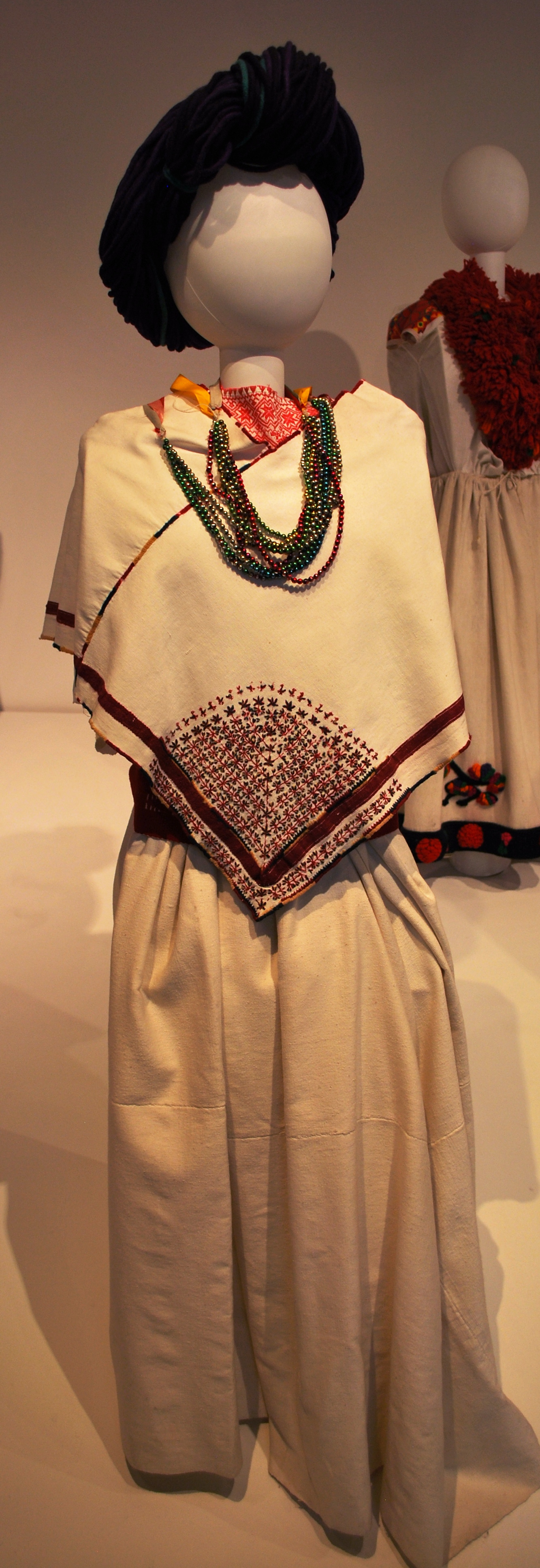
Garb from the Nahua community of Cuetzalan, Puebla, on display at the Museo de Arte Popular in Mexico City

Cosme Flores is from the city of Tlaxcala, son and grandson of weavers who made wool rugs. He began weaving when he was 11 along with working in agriculture. His work has won various prizes such as first place in the Concurso Estatal de Artesanias Tlaxcaltecas in 1993 and 1994. His work is also featured in a permanent exhibition at the Museo de Artes y Tradiciones Populares de Tlaxcala.

Justina Oviedo Rangel is of the Huave ethnic group in Oaxaca. She began weaving when she was eight on her own while playing. When her mother saw her ability, she began to give her formal lessons. She specializes in napkins, placeholders and tablecloths, but also makes huipils. She also makes figures of clay. Her work has won awards such as the Concurso de Tejido de San Mateo del Mar in 1978 and various times since then until 1989.

Evaristo Borboa was born in Tenancingo, Mexico State, where the making of rebozos is a tradition. He began weaving when he was 12, making rebozos using a backstrap loom, rather than the European loom. This means that each of his rebozos are made individually rather 26-30 at a time, which is possible with larger looms. He is also known for his knotted or "ikat" technique as well as the jasper style. Interested in older styles of rebozos, he began in experiment in 1947 with these older designs. In the 1960s, upon visiting the Virgin of Zapopan, he noticed that the image was wrapped only in a simple shawl. He offered to make the image new rebozo, something he has done every year since. Recognition has come late in Borboa's life winning awards from FONART and state agencies starting in the 1990s.

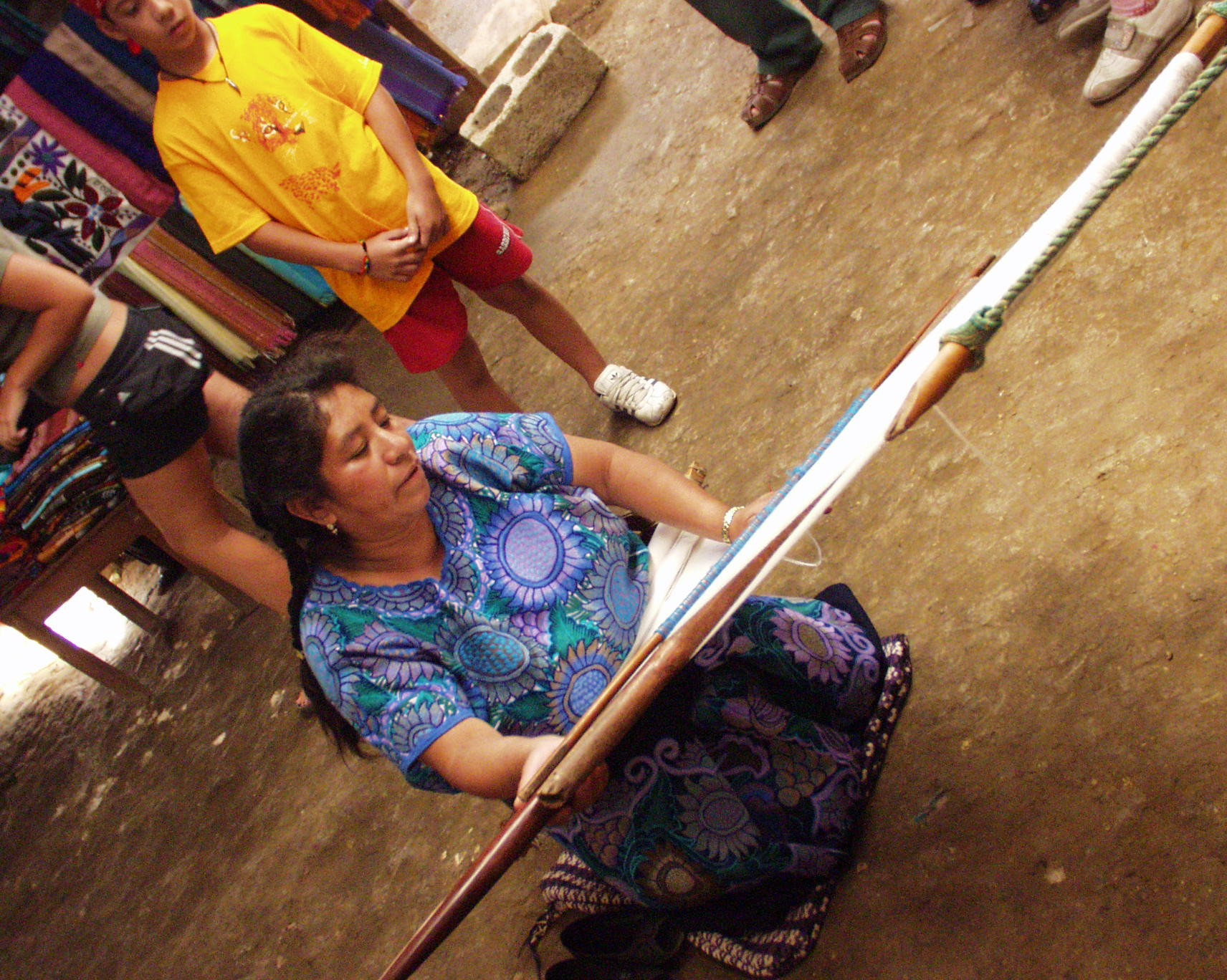
Woman weaving on backstrap loom in Chiapas

Handcrafted textiles have also been promoted as a tourist attraction in its own right. This is especially true in the state of Chiapas. Mexican handcrafted textiles have experienced a resurgence of interest due to the reassessment of them as a luxury item and the rising interest in some consumer sectors in locally crafted wares. Many of these textiles are being incorporated into items sold by globally recognized brands. Louis Vuitton, who has manufacturing facilities in Mexico, sponsored an exhibition called "Historias de Tradición artesanal" (Stories of Artisan Tradition) at the Museo de Arte Popular in Mexico City.

However, handcrafted textiles not only compete with other types of imported textiles, but also countries like China and Guatemala are producing imitations of traditional Mexican indigenous designs. These can be found both inside and outside of Mexico. The Asociacion de Mujeres Empresarias in Chiapas considers the imitations to be a form of trademark infringement and puts native weavers livelihoods at risk. Organizations such as this work to have indigenous designs marked as intangible world heritage to protect it with markers for authenticity—much as is done for tequila or Talavera pottery.

== Current textile industry ==
=== Current importance of the sector ===
Modern textile production in Mexico dates back to the era of Porfirio Díaz from the 1880s to 1910. Today, textile production plays an important role in the gross domestic product of Mexico, since it is exported and generates employment. Textile production includes the making of thread, cloth and decoration, in both natural and synthetic fibers. It accounts for about 1.2% of the total GDP and 7.1% of the manufacturing sector. It is the fourth largest manufacturing activity in the country. From the end of the Mexican Revolution to the mid-2000s, the sector saw steady growth. Much of the growth in the last four decades was spearheaded by "maquiladoras" or manufacturing plants along the northern border, which can import raw materials duty-free to make exportable products.

Another important textile area is the state of Guanajuato, which is Mexico's third largest producer. Some of these products include clothing, thread and sewing fabric, sheets, tablecloths, decorative pillows, rugs, carpets and tarps. Clothing items include jeans, other pants, blouses, tshirts, sweaters, vests, jackets, skirts and others, for national and international brands such as Liverpool, Chipieco, Carhartt, Echojeans, Polo Ralph Lauren, JCPenney, Old Navy, Timberland and more.

However, in the mid-2000s, the sector began to decline, mostly due to foreign competition. A significant number of jobs have been lost since 2003 as well as a number of factories. Many of these operations and jobs are shifting to Asia.

=== Exports to the United States ===
The U.S. is the largest textile importer and almost all textile producing countries compete for a share of this market. Mexico ranks fourth in textile exports to the U.S. according to OTEXA. Mexico's advantages in this market are its proximity and favorable tariffs, especially since the passage of NAFTA. In 2004, all restrictions and quotas on Mexican textiles were lifted in the United States.

However, textile exports to the U.S. fell from more than 11 billion dollars in 2004 to just over 10 billion in 2005, as the U.S. imports more from other countries, who produce more cheaply.

From January through September 2004, U.S. imports of Mexican-made apparel reached $5.069 billion, 4.3% below the total registered for the same period in 2003, according to the CNIV, Mexico's textile industry association. Meanwhile, U.S. imports of Chinese garments grew 21.7% during that period to reach $6.69 billion Yet Mexican-made products began to lose their competitiveness in the U.S. because taxes and tariffs on imports from other countries were also dropping.

=== Non-U.S. markets ===
While the U.S. is by far the major market for Mexican textiles, Mexico has free-trade pacts with 43 countries, one of the largest such networks in the world. Until very recently, this did not include China, which has been seen as an "enemy" rather than as a potential trading partner. There has been changes in this as Mexico seeks to expand business ties with China, especially in attracting capital. In the Americas, Mexico is part of the Central America Free Trade Agreement, and recently Mexico and Peru struck a deal for the import and export of clothing and other textiles. Mexico's textile exports to Canada increased fivefold by the mid-2000s, raising its market share in that country to five percent. Export growth to Canada has slowed since then but remains fairly strong.

=== Domestic clothing market ===
Nine major chain stores control 40% of the brick-and-mortar sales, but approximately 58% of the domestic clothing market obtains its goods through illegal channels, either through smuggling, robbery or the evasion of taxes. Much of the illegal Chinese textiles sold in Mexico enter through the United States, where labels are changed to avoid Mexico's 533% tariff on Chinese goods.

=== Mexico's international competitors ===
In addition to those from China, Mexican textile exports face competition from India, Bangladesh, Pakistan, Indonesia, Vietnam, Hong Kong and Central America. In 2000, Mexican textiles held around 12% of the U.S. market while Indian textiles 3.84%. Other Asian countries with presence include Hong Kong (5.7%), Indonesia (5.3), Vietnam and Bangladesh (5% each) .

Much of the reason for this is that labor costs are significantly higher in Mexico than in Asia. Mexico also has regulations that inhibit investment, as well as stricter environmental laws. Mexican fabrics cost 3.45 dollars per square meter while Chinese textiles cost 2.69 dollars. While the cost of Mexican fabric has increased 2%, those from a number of other countries in Asia and Central America have gone down. One major factor behind this is Mexico's relatively expensive labor costs. Another reason Asian products are cheaper is that utilities, such as electricity, gas and transport, are cheaper.

China is Mexico's most important competitor. Not only are products from this country cheaper, the supply chain in China is more organized than in Mexico. For example, most threads used to sew clothing are produced in China; Mexico produces little, creating the need to import such. This can cause production delays. Mexico is also mostly limited to the making of basic items with little added value instead of more fashionable products that sell for more. In addition, Mexico also has protectionist policies designed to inhibit foreign investment and ownership of textile production facilities in the country.

One example of this is the maquiladora industries. Prior to the 2000s, maquiladoras owned by Asian concerns who imported materials from Asia to make products for the U.S. enjoyed the same tax advantages as those who used Mexican suppliers. However, this was changed during the beginning of the 21st century. This caused many Asian maquiladoras to close and move to Asia as the tax advantages no longer compensated for higher labor costs.

Mexico has also complained to the World Trade Organization that China has been engaging in "illegal practices" such as "dumping" (selling abroad at a price lower than local markets) to the detriment of the Mexican industry. Mexico claims that the Chinese government subsidizes textiles sales abroad to gain market share.

== See also ==
- American carpets and rugs
- La Constancia Mexicana
