= Ruggable =

Home decor brand known for machine-washable rugs

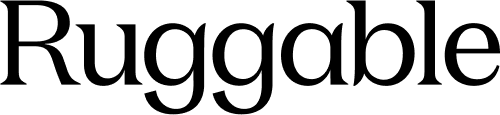
- Founded: 2008
- Founder: Jeneva Bell
- Headquarters: Gardena, California, United States
- Products: Rugs
- Number of employees: 1,000 (2024)
- Website: ruggable.com

Ruggable is a home decor brand best known for its machine-washable rugs and other easy-to-maintain home accessories. The company offers an all-in-one rug system with an integrated non-slip backing, as well as a two-piece rug system consisting of a decorative rug cover and a separate non-slip pad. Its product catalog includes rugs, doormats, bath mats, play mats, pet beds, and throw pillows.

== History ==
In 2008, Jeneva Bell and her business partner were trying to create a product. They were inspired by the velvet Huggable Hangers they saw on TV and decided to design a machine washable rug. The product was in prototyping for two years. Jeneva then bought out her business partner. In 2017, a venture capitalist firm invested in Ruggable and it allowed them to launch their website and digital advertisements. This investment ramped up their growth.

== See also ==
- American carpets and rugs
- Karastan – American brand of oriental rugs
- Kilim – Flat tapestry-woven carpet
- Dhurrie – Cotton flatweave carpet
- Underlay – Layer of cushioning material under a carpet or other soft flooring
