= American carpets and rugs =

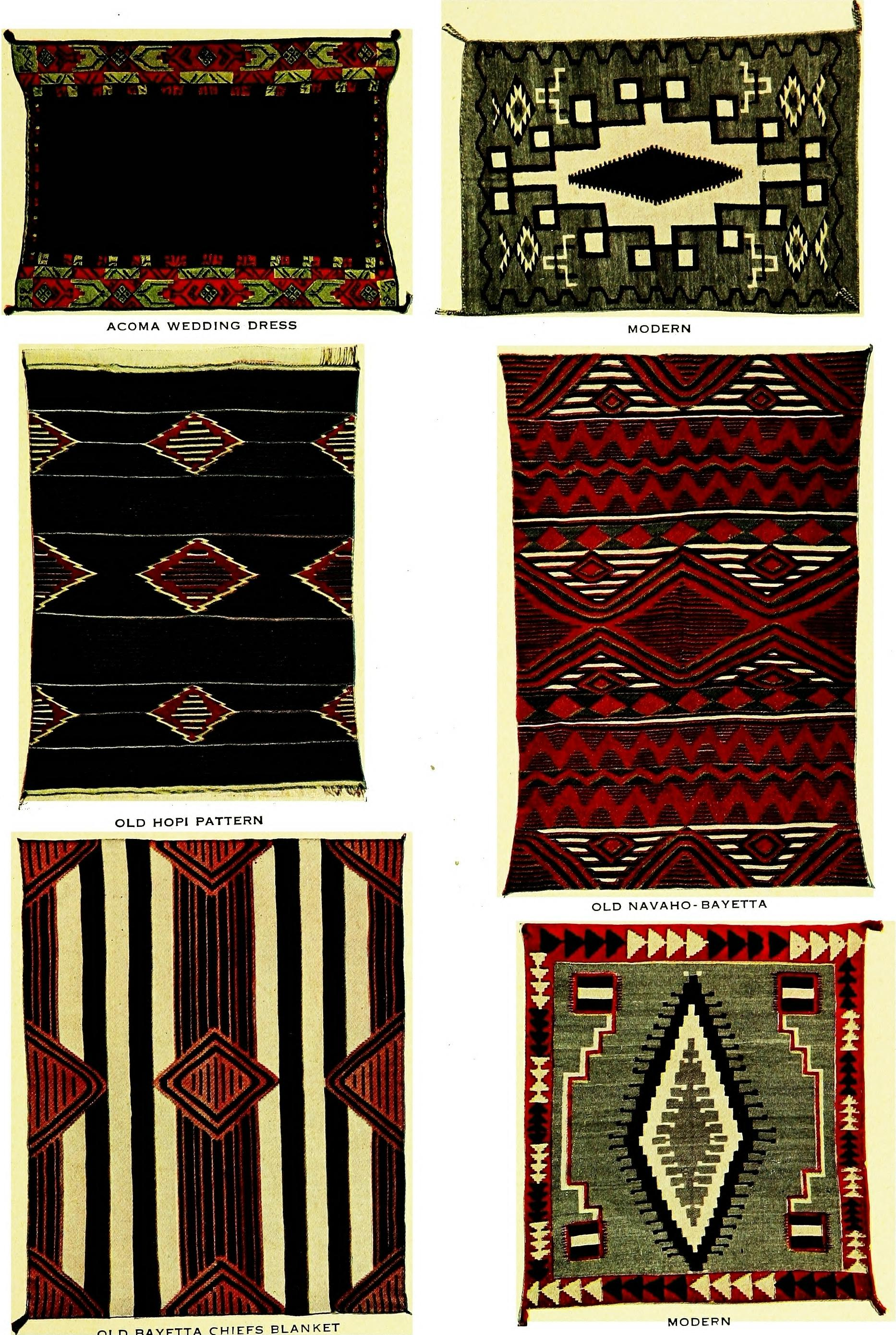
American Indians - first families of the Southwest (1920)

The American rug industry began in the second half of the 19th century. Although Americans had been importing European rugs via England since the colonists landed in Massachusetts, tariffs after the Revolutionary War diminished the importation business. Replacing English importations were American manufactories established in southern New England.

== History ==
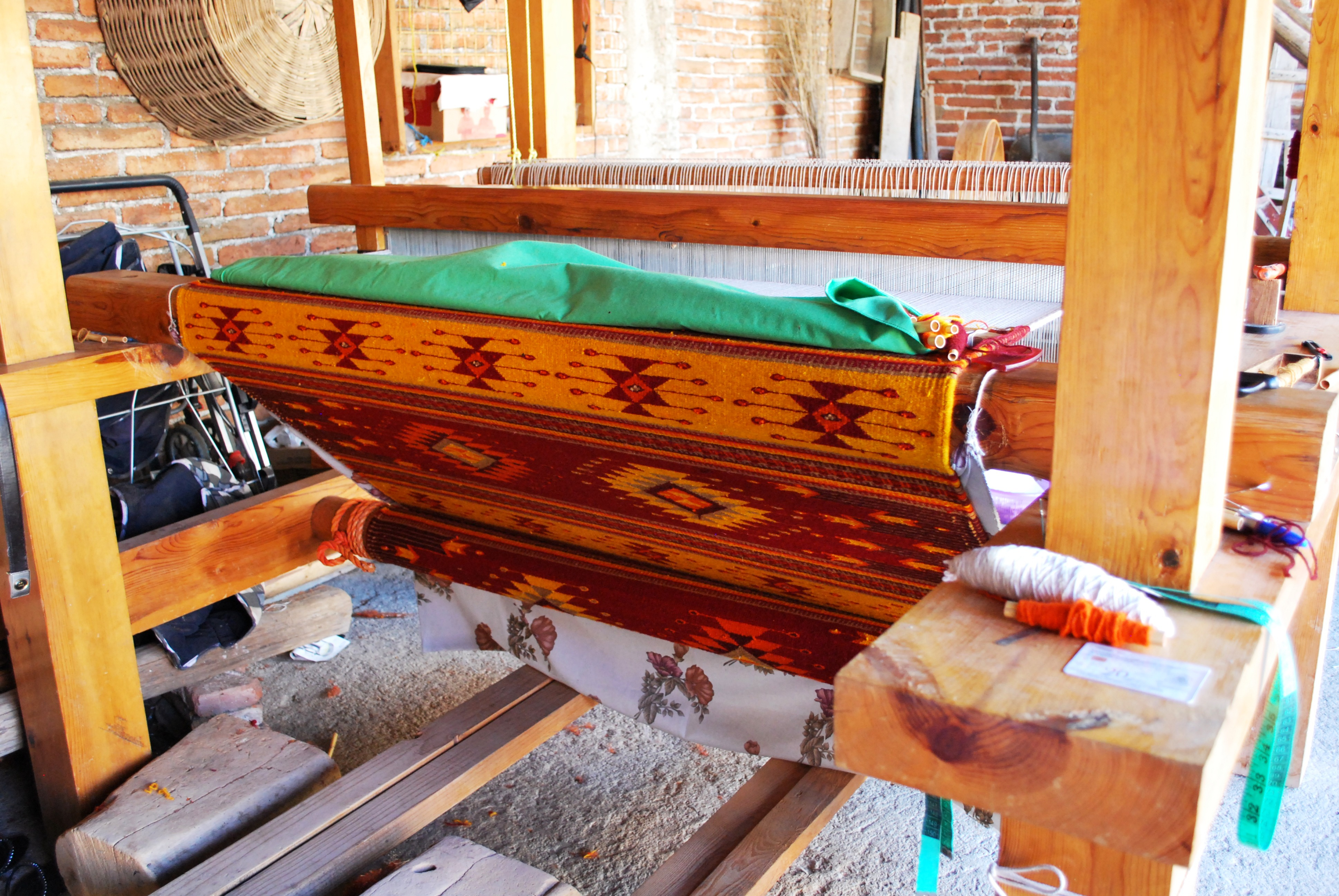
Rug in progress in Teotitlan del Valle, Oaxaca

The history of rugs in America is extensive; however, today hooked rugs and Navajo rugs are synonymous with American rug design. Settlers who were working with limited resources developed hooked rugs in the 17th century. The rugs continued to be popular through the 19th century. The design motifs on early American hooked rugs varied, consisting predominantly of geometric patterns, floral designs, landscapes, seascapes and animals. No matter what the motif, hooked rugs displayed a great sense of individual expression.

== See also ==
- Catalogne (rug) – French Canadian woven rug
- Karastan – American brand of oriental rugs
- Ruggable – Home decor brand known for machine-washable rugs
- Textiles of Mexico
