= Ixtle =

Plant fiber from Mexican species of agave and yucca

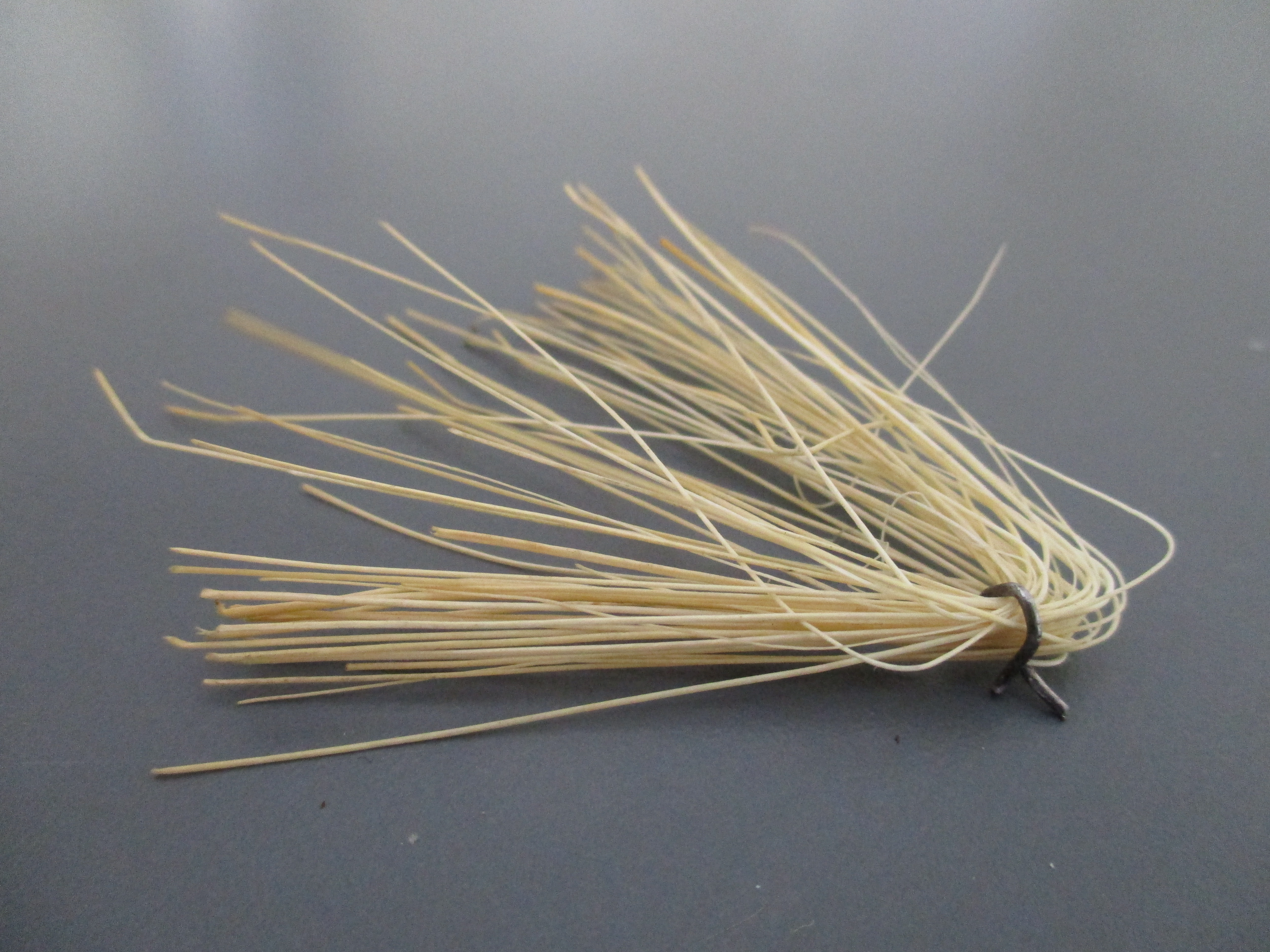
Tuft of Ixtle fiber and metal staple from a brush

Ixtle, also known by the trade name Tampico fiber, is a stiff plant fiber obtained from a number of Mexican plants, chiefly species of Agave and Yucca. The principal source is Agave lechuguilla, the dominant Agave species in the Chihuahuan Desert. Ixtle is the common name (or part of the common name) of the plants producing the fiber. Ixtle is also the common name of a species of bromeliad, Aechmea magdalenae, grown in southern Mexico for its silky fibers.

Ixtle fiber is used as a substitute for animal bristles in the manufacture of brushes, cords, and lariats. Wrapped with thread, parallel bundles of fiber were used as the boning in corsets.

== Types ==
Particular kinds of Ixtle include:

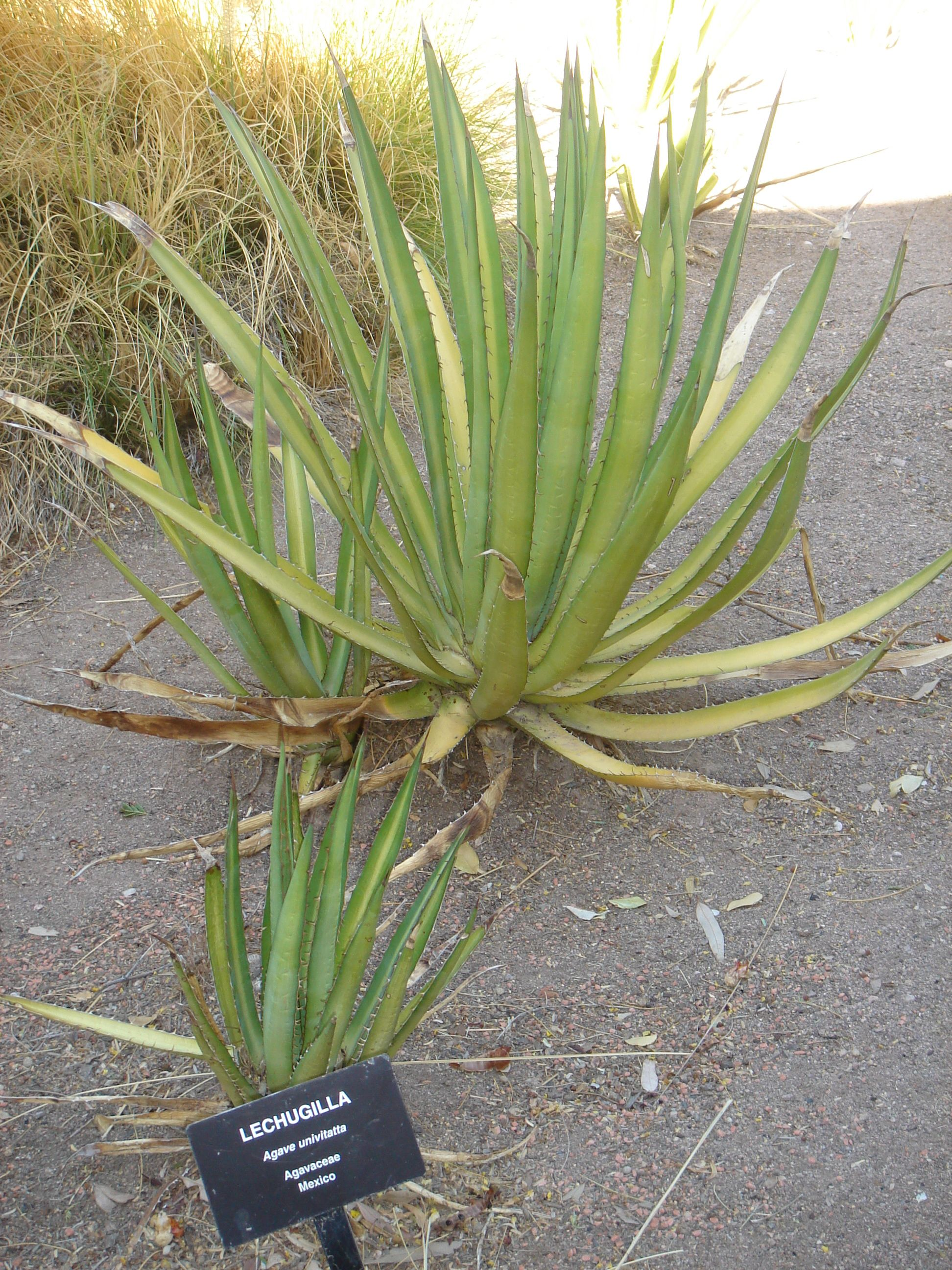
Agave univittata, used in the production of Tula Ixtle

- Tula Ixtle, produced from Agave lechuguilla or Agave univittata. The name is derived from the town of Tula, also in the Mexican state of Tamaulipas. The fiber is also obtained from the inner leaves, and is 13–30 in (33–76 cm) long and almost white.
- Jaumave Ixtle, produced from Agave funkiana (syn. A. lophantha), is said to be the best grade. The name comes from the Jaumave Valley in the Mexican state of Tamaulipas, where it is grown. The fiber is obtained from the young inner leaves that form the central bud. Jaumave Ixtle fibre is usually 20–40 in (51–102 cm) long, almost white, and almost as strong and flexible as sisal, produced from Agave sisaliana.
- Palma Ixtle, produced from the young leaves of species of Yucca, known as palmas in Spanish. The main species used is Yucca carnerosana (syn. Samuela carnerosana), although Yucca treculeana is also used. The fiber is more difficult to extract from yuccas than from agaves, requiring the leaves to be steamed first for two to four hours. Individual fibers are 20–40 in (51–102 cm) long, yellow, and usually coarser and stiffer than sisal. The fiber is described as "somewhat gummy".
