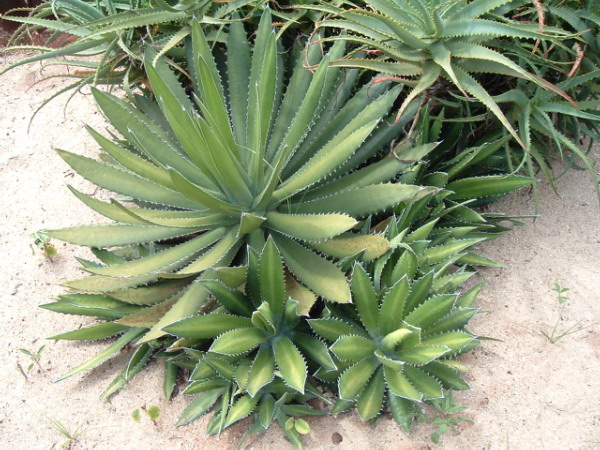

Conservation status
- Least Concern (IUCN 3.1)

- Secure (NatureServe)

Scientific classification
- Kingdom: Plantae
- Clade: Tracheophytes
- Clade: Angiosperms
- Clade: Monocots
- Order: Asparagales
- Family: Asparagaceae
- Subfamily: Agavoideae
- Genus: Agave
- Species: A. univittata

Binomial name
- Agave univittata Haw.

Synonyms
- List of synonyms: Agave caerulescens Salm-Dyck ex Jacobi; Agave heteracantha Zucc.; Agave heteracantha var. univittata (Haw.) A. Terracc.; Agave lophantha Schiede ex Kunth; Agave lophantha var. angustifolia A.Berger; Agave lophantha var. brevifolia Jacobi; Agave lophantha f. caerulescens (Salm-Dyck ex Jacobi) Voss; Agave lophantha var. caerulescens (Salm-Dyck ex Jacobi) Jacobi; Agave lophantha var. gracilior Jacobi; Agave lophantha var. pallida A.Berger; Agave lophantha var. poselgeri A.Berger; Agave lophantha var. subcanescens Jacobi; Agave univittata var. angustifolia (A.Berger) Jacobson; Agave univittata var. brevifolia Jacobi) Jacobson; Agave univittata var. caerulescens (Salm-Dyck ex Jacobi) H.Jacobsen; Agave univittata var. gracilior (Jacobi) Jacobson; Agave univittata var. heteracantha (Zucc.) Breitung; Agave univittata var. subcanescens (Jacobi) Jacobson; Agave vittata Regel

= Agave univittata =

Species of flowering plant

Agave univittata, the thorn-crested century plant or thorn-crested agave, is a plant species native to coastal areas of southern Texas and northeastern Mexico, at elevations less than 100 m (300 feet). It has been widely named Agave lophantha by botanists including Howard Scott Gentry, but the name A. univittata is older and therefore more in accord with nomenclatural rules of botany.

Agave univittata has thick, fleshy leaves that are stiff and undulate (wavy) along the margins. It has sharp and prominent spines on the edges and tips of the leaves. The flowering stalk is up to 5 m (16 feet) tall, bearing greenish-white to yellow-ish green flowers.

It is cultivated as an ornamental plant, and in the UK the cultivar 'Quadricolor' has won the Royal Horticultural Society's Award of Garden Merit.

Because the species is widespread and the overall population is stable, it is not considered by the IUCN to be threatened.
