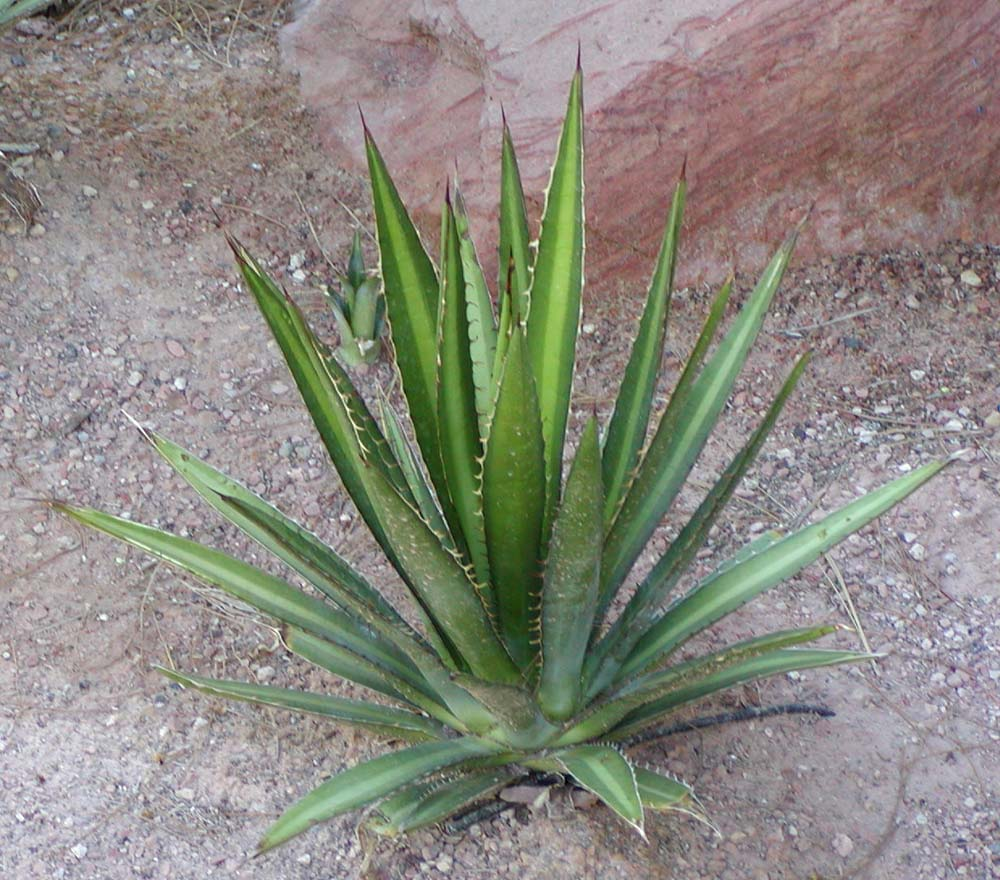

Conservation status
- Least Concern (IUCN 3.1)

- Secure (NatureServe)

Scientific classification
- Kingdom: Plantae
- Clade: Tracheophytes
- Clade: Angiosperms
- Clade: Monocots
- Order: Asparagales
- Family: Asparagaceae
- Subfamily: Agavoideae
- Genus: Agave
- Species: A. lechuguilla

Binomial name
- Agave lechuguilla Torr.

Synonyms
- Agave lechuguilla f. glomeruliflora (Engelm.) Trel.; Agave poselgeri Salm-Dyck; Agave heteracantha Jacobi, illegitimate; Agave multilineata Baker; Agave lophantha var. tamaulipasana A.Berger; Agave univittata var. tamaulipasana (A.Berger) Jacobson

= Agave lechuguilla =

Species of plant endemic to Chihuahuan Desert

Agave lechuguilla (common name in Chihuahua: lechuguilla, meaning "small lettuce") is an Agave species found only in the Chihuahuan Desert. The plant flowers once in its life and then dies.

== Description ==
The plant reproduces most often through underground offshoots, creating large colonies. It also can flower at any time after the plant has reached three to 21 years of age, producing a leafless stalk that can reach 3.7 metres (12 feet) in height. The flower clusters are located at the top and are funnel-shaped in purples, reds, and yellows. The plant dies after flowering in May–July. The leaves are long, tough, and rigid, with very sharp, hard points that can easily penetrate clothing and even leather, giving the colloquial name "shin-daggers".

== Taxonomy ==
Charles Wright first collected the plant in 1849 and it was described by John Torrey in 1859.

== Distribution and habitat ==
It is an indicator species in the Chihuahuan Desert, the only place it is found. It typically grows on calcareous soils.

== Ecology ==
The plant makes up a large part of the diet of the collared peccary (javelina) in some areas. Additionally, the flowers are a source of nutrients for insects, bats, and some birds. The plant is toxic to cattle and sheep, however.

== Uses ==
The water stored in the flowering stalks of this plant, rich in salts and minerals, is sold in Mexico as a sport drink. Native Mexicans have used fibers from the leaves (commonly called ixtle). Roots of the plants were used as soap by Native Americans.
