= Karastan =

American brand of oriental rugs

- Product type: Oriental rug
- Current owner: Mohawk Industries
- Produced by: Marshall Field's
- Country: United States
- Introduced: 1928; 98 years ago
- Previous owners: Marshall Field's, Cannon Mills, Fieldcrest Cannon
- Website: www.karastan.com

Karastan is an American brand of oriental rugs, made from 1928 to 2021 from worsted wool.

== History ==
In 1921, the retailer Marshall Field's established a textile mill in Eden, North Carolina, as part of its Homecrest Rug division. In 1928, one of its engineers, Eugene Clark, modified the Axminster broadlooms to make something closely resembling a handwoven Persian carpet. These rugs were then marketed under the invented name "Karastan" with individual names based on famous rug-producing areas in Asia such as Ispahan, Kirman, Sarouk, Oushak or Turkoman.

The brand made a name for itself at the 1933 Chicago World's Fair, when a Karastan rug was placed on the floor for 12 million people to walk across, proving its durability. The 1937 "Kirman 717" carpet became the company's bestseller, and proved so durable that it is now also traded as an antique.

In 1953, the rug business was sold to a Boston investment company and reincorporated, reusing the name Fieldcrest Mills. That company merged with the textile company Cannon Mills to become Fieldcrest Cannon in 1986, resulting in a bankruptcy as well as mass layoffs and labor disputes. In 1993, Mohawk Industries purchased the Karastan business. In 2021, it closed the Eden production facilities and ended wool rug production, consolidating its textile production in Georgia where synthetic carpets will continue to be made under the Karastan brand.
