= Ignacio Maria Barreda =

Mexican painter

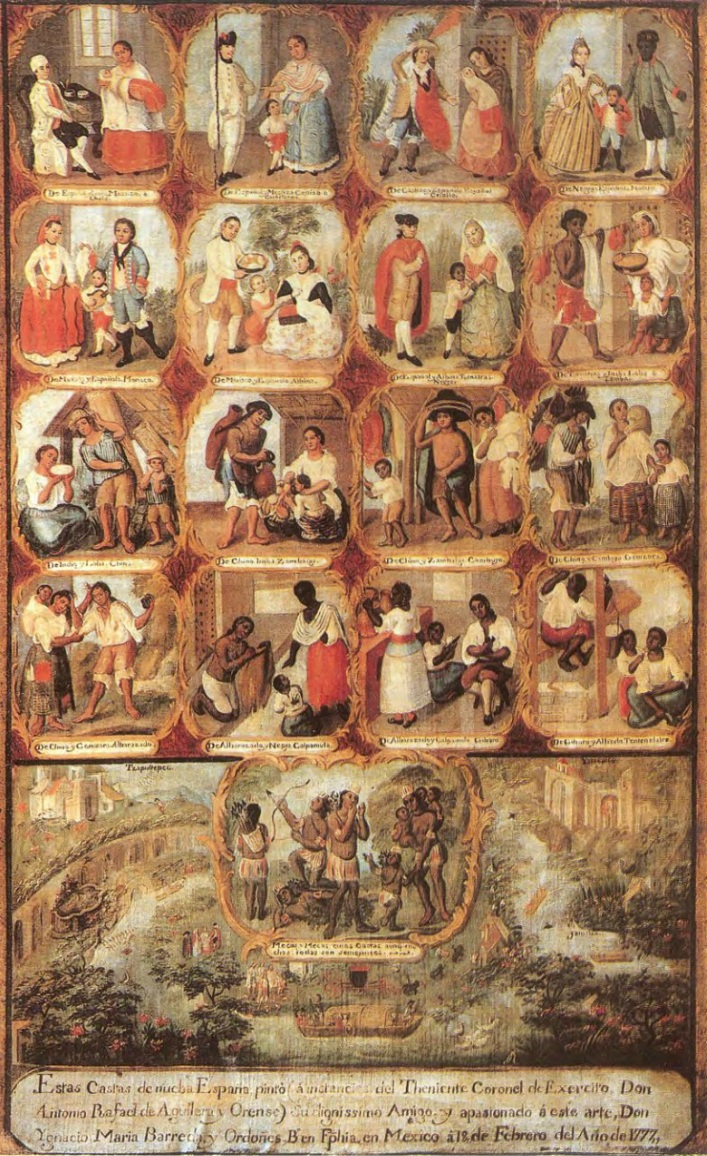
Casta painting showing 16 hierarchically arranged, mixed-race groupings, with indios mecos set outside of the orderly set of "civilized" society. Ignacio Maria Barreda, 1777. Real Academia Española de la Lengua, Madrid.

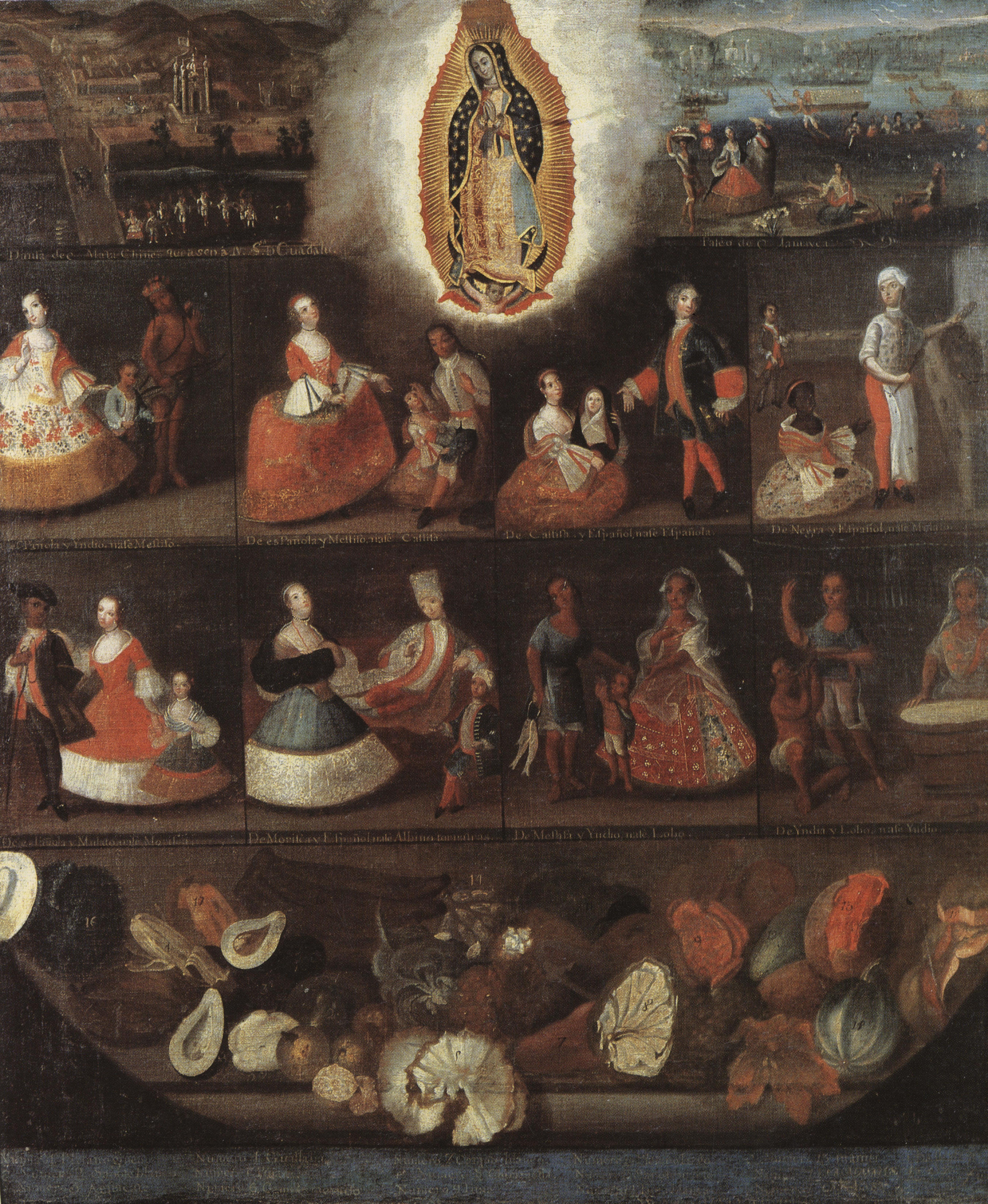
Luis de Mena, Virgin of Guadalupe and castas, 1750. Another single-canvas casta painting with similarities to Barreda's. Museo de América, Madrid.

Ignacio María Barreda was an eighteenth-century painter from New Spain, self-identified as university graduate with a Bachiller in philosophy. Mexican art historian Manuel Toussaint noted him for his portraits, including two of elite women, reproduced in his publication, and others of elite religious men. Toussaint believed he might be the official painter for the Seminario de San Camila, His 1777 single-canvas casta painting is an exemplar of this eighteenth-century genre of secular art. It is similar in some ways to the 1750 single-canvas painting by Luis de Mena, which also includes outdoor scenes near Mexico City, particularly the Paseo de Ixtacalco.

The painting, now in the Real Academia Española de la Lengua, Madrid, is one of the few signed and dated casta paintings, with a cartouche at the bottom reading: "These castes of New Spain were painted (upon the request of Lieutenant Colonel Antonio Rafael Aguilera y Orense) by his great friend and art enthusiast Don Ygnacio María Barreda y Ordones, Bachiller en Philosophy, in Mexico [City] on 18 February 1777." [Estas Castas de nueba España pinto (a instancias del Thenient Coronel de Exercito Don Antonio Rafael de Aguilera y Orense) Su dignissimo Amigo, y apasionado a este arte, Don Ygnacio María Barreda y Ordoñes Br [Bachiller] en Fphia [Filosofía], en México a 18 de Febrero del Año de 1777.]

In this casta painting, there are 16 groupings of parents and offspring, the usual number in most sets, with indios bárbaros or Chichimecas in a separate cell at the bottom. The caption identifies the nearly naked adults and children as Mecos and Mecas whose numerous castes are alike.”[Mecos y Mecas, cuias Castas, aunque muchas, todas son semejantes.]

The casta terms used in his painting often differ from those used by other painters. Most painters use only one term for a casta category, but Barreda uses Mestizo and Cholo as synonyms for the offspring of a Spaniard and an indigenous woman and Lobo and Zambo as synonyms. In both these cases the first is common in New Spain and the other in Peru. He uses Castizo and Cuarterón as synonyms for the offspring of a Spaniard and a Mestiza. Rarely are the offspring of a Spaniard and a Castiza shown in casta paintings, but in this case Barreda uses the term Español Criollo, Criollo (American-born) Spaniard.

== See also ==
- Casta painting
- Mexican art
