= José Joaquín Magón =

Mexican painter

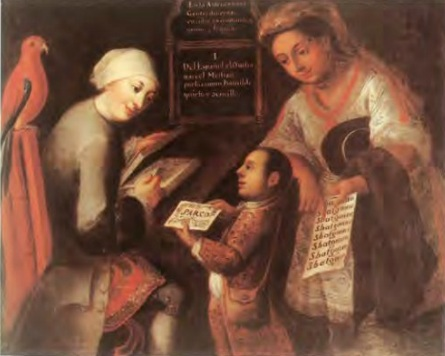
José Joaquín Magón, Spaniard + India = Mestizo. I. "Born of the Spaniard and the India is a Mestizo, who is generally humble, tranquil, and straightforward." Museo de Antropología, Madrid. 115 x 141 cm.

José Joaquín Magón was a late eighteenth-century Mexican painter from Puebla de los Angeles.

== Biography ==
Little is known of his personal life, but he was a well-known artist who produced a large number of extant religious paintings and portraits of high ecclesiastics in Puebla. He also produced two sets of casta paintings in the 1770s, not mentioned in the works of art historians Manuel Toussaint and Francisco Pérez Salazar, who are silent on the genre of casta painting. One set of his casta paintings is signed and the other is identified as Magón's by María Concepción García Sáiz. Most of Magón's works are religious in theme and some can be found in churches in Puebla. He was commissioned to produce paintings "for the triumphal arch on the occasion of the crowning of Charles III."

His two sets of casta paintings have the same groupings of couples and offspring in different racial categories, but one set includes qualitative assessments of the racial categories of the offspring. The first set is signed in 1772 and was brought back to Toledo, Spain by Archbishop Francisco Antonio Lorenzana. As with most casta paintings, there is no information on if or where such paintings were displayed, but Lorenzana founded a cabinet of natural history in the Alcázar of Toledo. The cabinet attracted notice of travelers, including Antonio Ponz (1725–1792), who remarked on it in his publication Viaje de España.

== A set of Magón’s casta paintings ==
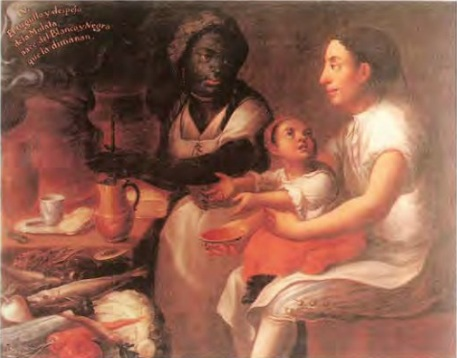
José Joaquín Magón. Spaniard + Negra - Mulato. IV. "The pride and sharp wits of the Mulata are instilled by her white father [Blanco] and black mother.”

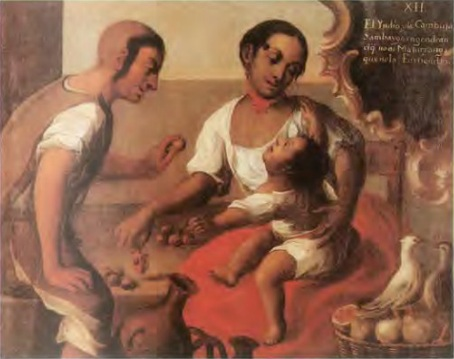
José Joaquin Magón. Indio + Cambujo Zambaiga - "No la Entienda". "The Indian and Cambujo Zambaigo woman produce the one no person understands who he is."

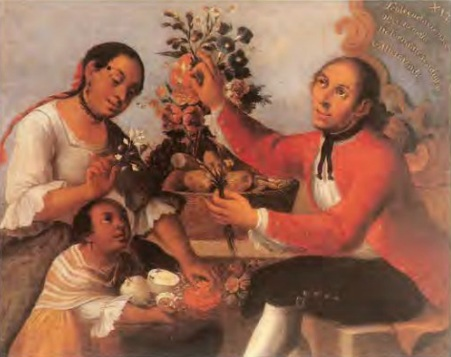
José Joaquín Magón. Tente en el aire + Torna atrás - Albarazado. “XVI. The Tente en el Aire is born (badly) of harsh Torna-atrás mother and Albarazado”.

Unique in the casta painting genre is this set is identified as by Magón, although the canvasses are unsigned. They are dated as approximately 1770. Each canvas includes descriptions of “character and moral standings of these individuals” depicted, some of which are quite pejorative. However, these descriptions do not necessarily reflect the views of Magón himself, as he appears to have left a blank space for the commentary to be written by someone else, or to add himself under guidance from a third party. The Spaniard with his India wife in canvas I is reading Don Quixote and, in canvas III, the Spaniard is seen writing and there are books on shelves behind him, among them Virgil. These are indicators of Spaniards’ “educated character.”

Here are the descriptions on each of the canvases:

"In the Americas people of different colors, customs, temperaments and languages are born.” [En la América nacen Gentes diversas en color, en costumbres, genios, y lenguas].

I. Born of the Spaniard and the Indian woman is a Mestizo, who is generally humble, tranquil and straightforward. [Del Español y la Yndia nace el Mestizo, por lo común, humilde, quieto, y sencillo] (image in this article)

II. A Mestizo father and Spanish mother give the Castizo early mastery of horsemanship. [Mestizo y Española dan al Castizo la afición al caballo desde bien niño]

III. The son of a Spaniard and a Castiza takes entirely after his father. [De Español, y Castiza el Fructo bello se vé igual a su Padre y a pelo á pelo]

IV. The pride and sharp wits of the Mulatto woman are instilled by her white father [Blanco] and black mother. [El Orgullo, y despejo de la Mulata, nace del Blanco, y Negra que la dimanan].

V. The Spaniard and Mulatto woman pass on their respective character and ways to the Morisca girl. [Español, y Mulata, ser, y doctrina dan conforme a su genio a la Morisca].

VI. Born of the Spaniard and Morisco woman is the short-sighted, mild, slow and kindly Albino. [De Español, y Morisca nace el Albino corto de vista, devil suave, y venigno].

VII. The Torna atrás born of Albino father and Spanish mother has bearing, temperament and tradition. [Albino y Española, Los que producen de torna atrás, en figura, genio, y costumbres].

VIII. The Calpamulato born of Mulatto father and Indian mother has a wild temperament and is strong, broad and short. [Mulato, e Yndia engendran Calpa Mulato de indocile genio, fuerte, cuerpo cortiancho].

IX. The Jíbaro born of Indian mother and Calpamulato father is restless and almost always arrogant. [De Yndia, y Calpamulato, Gíbaro nace inquieto de Ordinario Siempre arrogante].

X. From Black father and Indian mother, the Lobo is bad blood: thieves and pickpockets. [De Negro é Yndia, Lovo, mala valea. Herodes son de bolsas, y faltriqueras].

XI. From Lobo and Indian woman, the Cambujo is usually slow, lazy and cumbersome. [Lova, é Yndia, Cambujo, es de ordinario pesado, y perezoso de ingenio tardo].

XII. The Indian and Cambujo Zambaigo woman produce the one no person understands who he is. [El Yndio, y la Cambuja Sambayga engendran el q no ai Maturranga que no la Entiendan]. (image in this article)

XIII. The tricky Quadroon is of Simple Mestizo father and Mulatto mother. [El Cuarteron Cabcioso a luz dimana, del Mestizo sencillo, y la Mulata].

XIV. The quarreling Quadroon and Mestizo wife beget the strong, bold Coyote. [Cuarteron, y Mestiza, siempre peleando engendran al Collote fuerte, y osado].

XV. From Coyote and Morisco woman, the mocking joke-playing Albarazado. [De Collote, y Morisca, el Abarazado nace, y se inclina a burlas, y chascos].

XVI. The Tente en el aire is born (badly) of harsh Torna-atrás mother and Albarazado. [Tente en el ayre, nace (ingerto malo) de Torna atrás adusta, y Albarazado]. (image in this article)

== See also ==
- casta painting
- Mexican art
