= Harnizo =

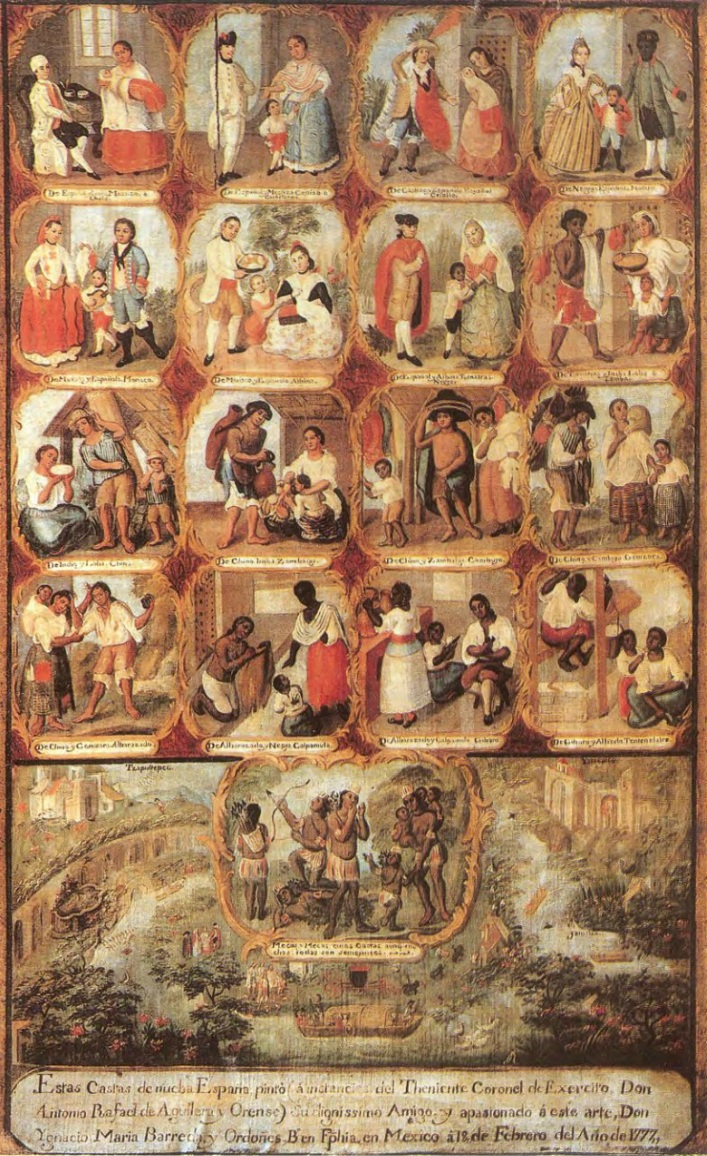
A Mexican casta painting

Harnizo was a casta within the colonial casta system, which existed at a social level in the Spanish Empire and its American colonies and was an ethnic category portrayed in eighteenth-century casta paintings. Castas classified people born as a result of intermarriage between the three ethnic groups that Spain considered to exist: indigenous, black, and spaniard. Harnizo was defined by the offspring of individuals belonging to the mestizo caste with the castizo casta. Harnizo also resulted from the mixing of a coyote with a Spaniard. Here, a coyote denotes a person born to a mestizo and an indigenous person.

Caste	% spaniard	% indigenous	% black
mestizo (español + india)	50	50	0
harnizo (castizo + mestiza)	62,5	37,5	0
castizo (mestizo + española)	75	25	0
