= Casta =

Mixed-race people of Spanish colonial regions in the 17th and 18th centuries

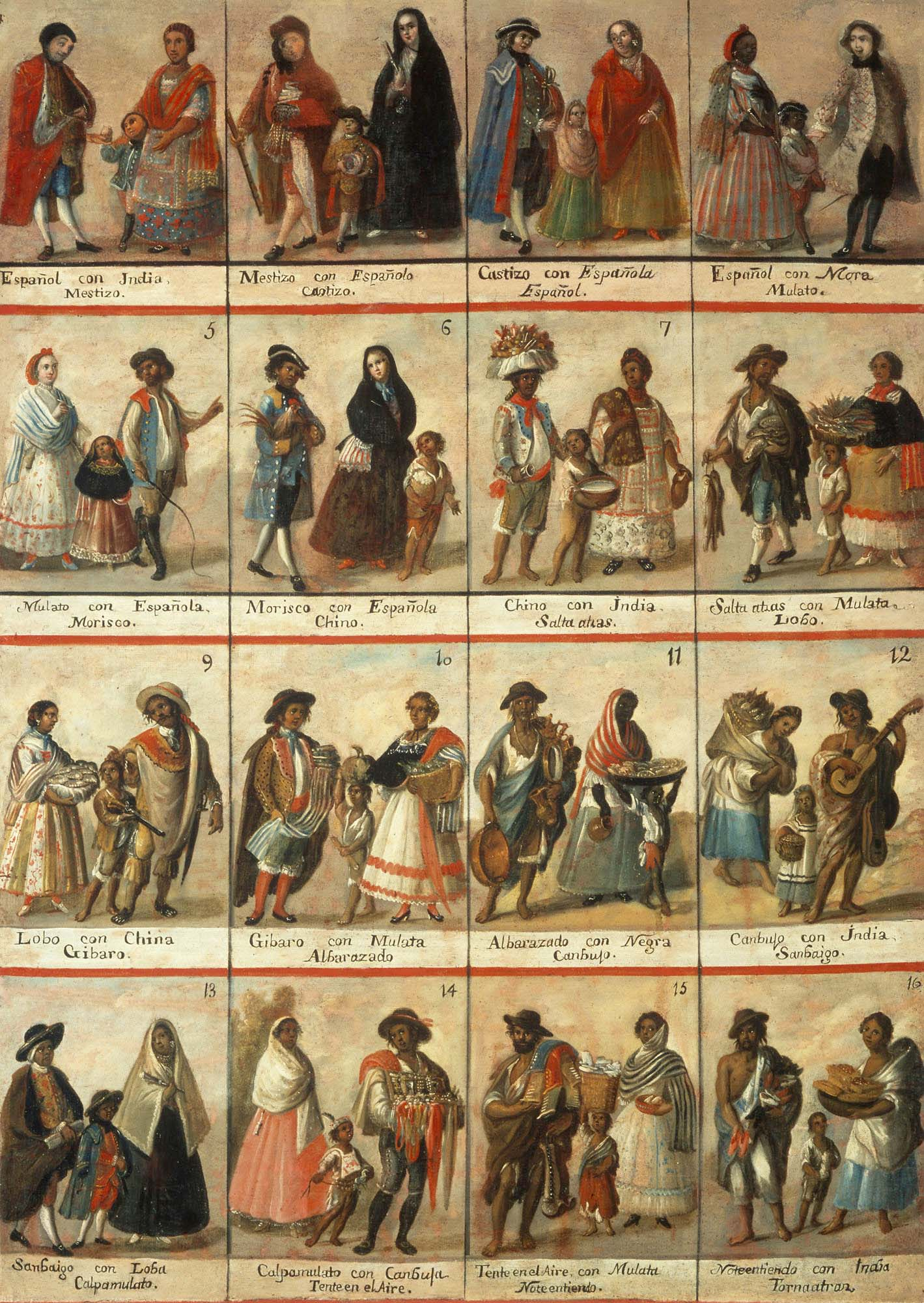
Las castas. A casta painting showing 16 racial groupings. Anonymous, 18th century, oil on canvas, 148×104 cm, Museo Nacional del Virreinato, Tepotzotlán, Mexico

Casta (Spanish: [ˈkasta]) is a term which means "lineage" in Spanish and Portuguese and has historically been used as a racial and social identifier. From the outset, colonial Spanish America resulted in widespread intermarriage: unions of Spaniards (españoles), Amerindians (indios), and black Africans (negros). Basic mixed-race categories that appeared in official colonial documentation were mestizo, generally offspring of a Spaniard and an Indian; and mulatto, offspring of a Spaniard and a black African.

A plethora of terms were used for people with mixed Spanish, Indian, and African ancestry in 18th-century casta paintings, but they are not known to have been widely used officially or unofficially in the Spanish Empire.

== Etymology ==
Casta is an Iberian word (existing in Spanish, Portuguese and other Iberian languages since the Middle Ages), meaning 'lineage'. It was first documented in Spanish in 1417 and is linked to the Proto-Indo-European *ger. The Portuguese casta gave rise to the English word caste during the early modern period.

== Use of Casta terminology ==
In the historical literature, how racial distinction, hierarchy, and social status functioned over time in colonial Spanish America has been an evolving and contested discussion. Although the term sistema de castas (system of castas) or sociedad de castas ("society of castas") are utilized in modern historical analyses to describe the social hierarchy based on race, with Spaniards at the apex, archival research shows that there is not a rigid "system" with fixed places for individuals.

The racial system was a more fluid social structure where individuals could move from one category to another, or maintain or be given different labels depending on the context. In the 18th century, "casta paintings", imply a fixed racial hierarchy, but this genre may well have been an attempt to bring order into a system that was more fluid. "For colonial elites, casta paintings might well have been an attempt to fix in place rigid divisions based on race, even as they were disappearing in social reality."

In New Spain (the colonial territory that is now Mexico and Central America) during the Mexican War of Independence, race and racial distinctions were an important issue and the end of imperial rule had strong appeal. José María Morelos, who was registered as a Spaniard in his baptismal records, called for the abolition of the formal distinctions the imperial regime made between racial groups, advocating for "calling them one and all Americans." Morelos issued regulations in 1810 to prevent ethnic-based disturbances. "He who raises his voice should be immediately punished." In 1821 race was an issue in the negotiations resulting in the Plan of Iguala.

== "Colonial Casta System" debate ==
The degree to which racial category labels had legal and social consequences has been subject to academic debate since the idea of a "casta system" was first developed by Polish-Venezuelan philologist Ángel Rosenblat and Mexican anthropologist Gonzalo Aguirre Beltrán in the 1940s. Both authors popularized the notion that racial status was the key organizing principle of Spanish colonial rule, a theory which became commonplace in the anglosphere during the latter half of the 20th century. However, recent academic studies in Latin America have widely challenged this notion, considering it a flawed and ideologically biased reinterpretation of the colonial period, as follows.

Pilar Gonzalbo, in her 2013 study La trampa de las castas discards the idea of the existence of a "casta system" or a "casta society" in New Spain, understood as a "social organization based on the race and supported by coercive power". She also affirms in her work that certain subliminal and derogatory messages in casta paintings were not a general phenomenon, and that they only began to be carried out in particular environments of the Criollo oligarchies after the Bourbon Reformism and the influx of ideas of scientific racism from the illustration within some encyclopedic environments of the colonial bourgeoisie.

Joanne Rappaport, in her 2014 book on colonial New Granada, The Disappearing Mestizo, rejects the casta system as an interpretative framework for that time, discussing both the legitimacy of a model valid for the entire colonial world and the usual association between "casta" and "race".

Similarly, Berta Ares' 2015 study on the Viceroyalty of Peru, notes that the term "casta" was barely used by colonial authorities which, according to her, casts doubt on the existence of a "casta system". Even by the 18th century, its use was rare and appeared in its plural form, "castas", characterized by its ambiguous meaning. The word did not specifically refer to sectors of the population who were of mixed race, but also included both Spaniards and Indians of lower socio-economic extraction, often used together with other terms such as plebe, vulgo, naciones, clases, calidades, otras gentes, etc.

Ben Vinson, in a 2018 study of the historical archives of Mexico, addressing the issue of racial diversity in Mexico and its relationship with imperial Spain, ratified these conclusions.

Often called the sistema de castas or the sociedad de castas, there was no fixed system of classification for individuals, as careful archival research has shown. There was considerable fluidity in society, with the same individuals being identified by different categories simultaneously or over time. Individuals self-identified by particular terms, often to shift their status from one category to another to their advantage. For example, both mestizos and Spaniards were exempt from tribute obligations, but were both equally subject to the Inquisition. Indios, on the other hand, paid tribute yet were exempt from the Inquisition. In certain cases, a mestizo might try to "pass" as an indio to escape the Inquisition. An indio might try to pass as a Mestizo to escape tribute obligations.

Casta paintings produced largely in 18th-century Mexico have influenced modern understandings of race in Spanish America, a concept which began infiltrating Bourbon Spain from France and Northern Europe during this time. They purport to show a fixed "system" of racial hierarchy which has been disputed by modern academia. These paintings should be evaluated as the production by elites in New Spain for an elite viewership in both Spanish territories and abroad portrayals of mixtures of Spaniards with other ethnicities, some of which have been interpreted as being pejorative in nature or seeking social outrage. They are thus useful for understanding elites and their attitudes toward non-elites, and quite valuable as illustrations of aspects of material culture in the late colonial era.

The process of mixing ancestries by the union of people of different races is known in the modern era as mestizaje (Portuguese: mestiçagem [mestʃiˈsaʒẽj], [mɨʃtiˈsaʒɐ̃j]). In Spanish colonial law, mixed-race castas were classified as part of the república de españoles and not the república de indios, which set Indians outside the Hispanic sphere with different duties and rights to those of Spaniards and Mestizos.

The casta system for these historians would have been misconstrued as being analogous to the castes of India. Given that in viceregal Spanish America there was never a closed system based on birth rights, where the birth rate and, therefore, wealth, created a "casta system" difficult to penetrate; but, rather, the statute of Limpieza de sangre (a concept of religious root and not biological or racial) was given, in which the Indian and the mestizo, as a new Christian, had limitations on access to certain trades until assimilation full of his conversion to Catholicism; but that did not prevent his social ascent, and he would even receive protections that would benefit his social mobilization, protections that the old Christian of the Republica de españoles would not enjoy (such as being free from all the taxes of the whites, with the exception of the Indian tribute, or be exempt from the Holy Inquisition). Then, those conceptions of a "casta society" or a "casta system" as characteristic of colonial society would be completely anachronistic formulations and could be part of the Spanish Black Legend. Given this, in works prior to those of Rosenblat and Beltrán, one would not find references to the notion that the Spanish empire was a society founded on racial segregation. Neither in Nicolás León, Gregorio Torres Quintero, Blanchard, nor in the Catalog of Herrera and Cicero (1895), nor in the article "Castas" of the Dictionary of History and Geography (1855), nor in Alexander von Humboldt's Political Essay on the Spanish-American territories that he visited on his scientific expeditions. Among other works that refer to the existence of castas and casta paintings, without implying connotations with modern racism, which would come to America after the French Enlightenment.

This would make these critics conclude that those colonial societies were rather of the class type, that although there was a relationship between class and race through castas, that was not in a cause relationship, but in a consequence relationship (not being an end in itself the race, which was understood in the Hispanic tradition as something purely spiritual, not so much biological). The purpose of the castas was to register the identity of lineages to register them in the republic of Spaniards, the republic of Indians, with the services and privileges acquired, which would not disturb the economic potential of the individual of the casta, nor would they have the purpose of to formally segregate them from positions of power, but to hierarchize them in feudal society (not equivalent to the same thing, as long as they were not prevented from ascending to the nobility or being part of the commercial petty bourgeoisie). Then, the viceroyalty society would be a society of "quality", estate, corporate, patronage and trade union, where each social group was not conditioned by their race, and neither did this establish the labor relations of its inhabitants. In the parish registers there would never have been the tendency to classify in so many innumerable mixtures as seen in the casta charts, which would be an artistic phenomenon typical of the Age of Enlightenment.

Some examples of blacks, mulattoes and mestizos who climbed socially would be used as evidence against these misrepresentations, such as: Juan Latino, Juan Valiente, Juan Garrido, Juan García, Juan Bardales, Sebastián Toral, Antonio Pérez, Miguel Ruíz, Gómez de León, Fran Dearobe, José Manuel Valdés, Teresa Juliana de Santo Domingo. Names of Indian chiefs and noble mestizos are also mentioned: Carlos Inca, Inca Garcilaso de la Vega, Manuela Taurichumbi Saba Cápac Inca, Alonso de Castilla Titu Atauchi Inga, Alonso de Areanas Florencia Inca, Gonzalo Tlaxhuexolotzin, Vicente Xicohténcatl, Bartolomé Zitlalpopoca, Lorenzo Nahxixcalzin, Doña Luisa Xicotencatl, Nicolás de San Luis Montañez, Fernando de Tapia, Isabel Moctezuma Tecuichpo Ixcaxochitzin, Pedro de Moctezuma. The Royal Decree of Philip II on 1559 is also often mentioned, in which it is prescribed that "the mestizos who come to these kingdoms to study, or for other things of their use (...) do not need another license to return." The document is important, because laws are not made for particular cases and it shows that the existence of multiple castas did not impede social mobilization within the Hispanic monarchy, the same mobilization that must have been significant to require the attention of a royal edict of the person of the Spanish king.

== "Purity of blood" and the evolution of racial classification ==
The system of castas was based on the concept of "purity of blood", limpieza de sangre, an idea which developed in Spain and spread through the Spanish Inquisition, and claimed that new converts to Christianity were prone to heresy. The idea gave rise to genealogical investigations in order to exclude people whose family had not been Christian.

The idea of limpieza de sangre is directly linked to religion and notions of legitimacy, lineage and honor following Spain's reconquest of Al-Andalus. The Inquisition only allowed those Spaniards without Jewish and Muslim backgrounds to emigrate to Latin America, although this prohibition was frequently ignored and a number of Spanish Conquistadors were Jewish Conversos and Moriscos. Others, such as Juan Valiente, were black Africans or had recent sub-Saharan ancestry.

Both in Spain and in the Americas, Spanish-Conversos and Spanish-Moriscos who continued to practice Judaism and Islam in secret were prosecuted. Spanish Conquistador Luis de Carvajal y de la Cueva was prosecuted by the Inquisition for secretly practicing Judaism and eventually died in prison.

The Inquisition investigated the Old Christian status of its officials in the Americas, a practice which also helped bring the idea of limpieza de sangre into the Americas. By the end of the 1500s, some records listed racial categories, black and mulatto, as well as sometimes mestizo and indio.

This was no impediment for intermarriage between Spaniards and Indians, just as it had not been between Old and New Christians or different racial groups coexisting in late medieval and early modern Spain.

However, starting in the late 16th century, some investigations of ancestry classified as "stains" any connection with black Africans ("negros", which resulted in "mulatos") and sometimes mixtures with Indians that produced mestizos. While some illustrations from the period show men of black African descent dressed in fashionable clothing and as aristocrats in upper-class surroundings, the idea that any hint of black ancestry were a stain developed by the end of the colonial period, an era during which biological racism began to emerge throughout the western world. This trend was illustrated in 18th-century paintings of racial hierarchy, known as casta paintings which led to 20th-century emergence of theories on a "Casta System" existing in Colonial Spanish America.

The idea in New Spain that native or "Indian" (indio) blood in a lineage was an impurity may well have come about as the optimism of the early Franciscans faded about creating Indian priests trained at the Colegio de Santa Cruz de Tlatelolco, which ceased that function in the mid-16th century. In addition, the Indian nobility, which was recognized by the Spanish colonists, had declined in importance, and there were fewer formal marriages between Spaniards and Indian women than during the early decades of the colonial era. In the 17th century in New Spain, the ideas of purity of blood became associated with "Spanishness and whiteness, but it came to work together with socio-economic categories", such that a lineage with someone engaged in work with their hands was tainted by that connection.

Indians in Central Mexico were affected by ideas of purity of blood from the other side. Crown decrees on purity of blood were affirmed by Indian communities, which barred Indians from holding office who had any non-Indians (Spaniards and/or black peoples) in their lineage. In Indian communities "local caciques [rulers] and principales were granted a set of privileges and rights on the basis of their pre-Hispanic noble bloodlines and acceptance of the Catholic faith." Indian nobles submitted proofs (probanzas) of their purity of blood to affirm their rights and privileges that were extended to themselves and their communities. This supported the república de indios, a legal division of society that separated Indians from non-Indians (república de españoles).

== Casta classifications and legal consequences ==
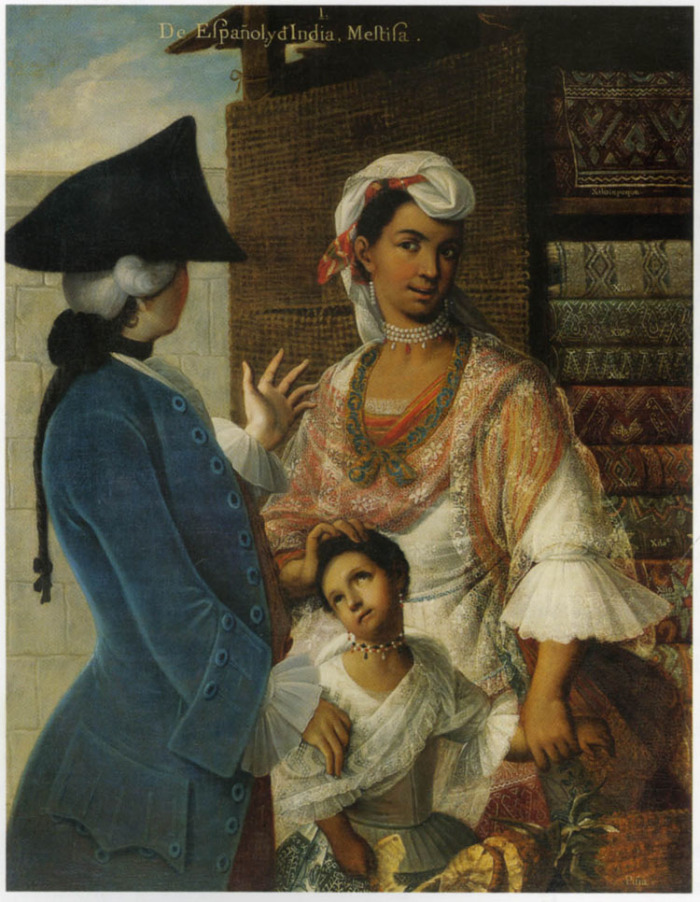
From a Spaniard and an Indian woman, a Mestiza. Miguel Cabrera, 1763

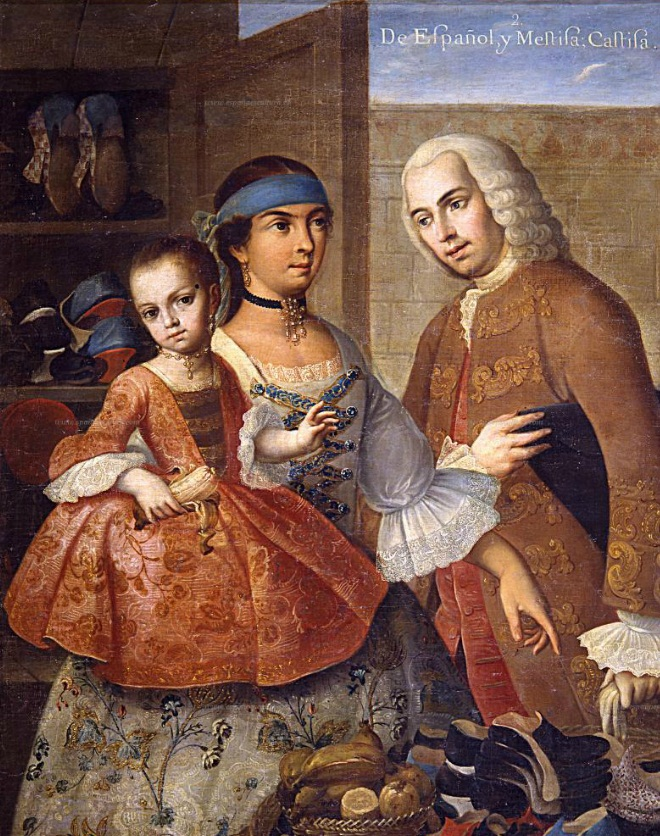
A Spanish (español) father, a Mestiza (mixed Spanish-Indian) mother, and their Castiza daughter. Miguel Cabrera

In Spanish America, racial terms established by the casta system described people's calidad (lit. "quality"), which was based on ideas of legal status as a tributary, someone who was liable for a head-tax, culture, and racial distinctions. Placement into the casta system was flexible, where people could unofficially 'pass' as a different race in order to gain the benefits of that race such as holding office that is reserved for whites, or shift labels for example to match the calidad of a spouse when marrying. Richard Boyer notes occasions where people would refer to each other using casta terms to describe qualities other than race, such as Christóbal de Toro who, in 1617, was referred to as "a mulato although white," with the use of 'although' showing that the term mulato was a reference to calidad rather than phenotype.

Castas were officially the groups between Spanish and Indians. Starting by the end of the 16th century, a series of royal decrees were made to maintain distance between black and Indian people. In 1551, it was stated as part of a decree that black people aided Indians in developing bad habits. Black people were forbidden to live with Indians in Peru in 1580, in Chile in 1586, and in Lima in 1587, though the number and frequency of later orders requiring separation suggest that the decrees were not entirely effective. The existence of free blacks and of the intermingling of free black and mulatto populations with white populations disrupted a Spanish vision of a two republics, one Spanish and one Indian.

Free blacks and Indians both paid a tribute tax, officially distinguishing them from whites, and a series of laws passed starting in 1577 were aimed at making it easier to collect taxes from the population of castas, which included making it illegal for black and mulatto people to carry weapons. Non-indigenous populations, including free blacks, also paid sales and customs taxes, officially distinguishing them from indigenous groups.

The crown had divided the population of its overseas empire into two categories, separating Indians from non-Indians. One were the República de Indios, the other the República de Españoles, essentially the Hispanic sphere, so that Spaniards, black people, and mixed-race castas were lumped into this category. Official censuses and ecclesiastical records noted an individual's racial category, so that these sources can be used to chart socio-economic standard, residence patterns, and other important data.

General racial groupings had their own set of privileges and restrictions, both legal and customary. So, for example, only Spaniards and Indians, who were deemed to be the original societies of the Spanish dominions, had recognized aristocracies. In the population at large, access to social privileges and even at times a person's perceived and accepted racial classification, were predominantly determined by that person's socioeconomic standing in society.

Official censuses and ecclesiastical records noted an individual's racial category, so that these sources can be used to chart socio-economic standards, residence patterns, and other important data. Parish registers, where baptism, marriage, and burial were recorded, had three basic categories: español (Spaniards), indio, and color quebrado ("broken color", indicating a mixed-race person). In some parishes in colonial Mexico, indios were recorded with other non-Spaniards in the color quebrado register.

Españoles and mestizos could be ordained as priests and were exempt from payment of tribute to the crown. Free black people, Indians, and mixed-race castas were required to pay tribute and barred from the priesthood. Being designated as an español or mestizo conferred social and financial advantages. Black men began to apply to the Royal and Pontifical University of Mexico, but in 1688 Bishop Juan de Palafox y Mendoza attempted to prevent their entrance by drafting new regulations barring black peoples and mulattoes.

In 1776, the crown issued the Royal Pragmatic on Marriage, taking approval of marriages away from the couple and placing it in their parents' hands. The marriage between Luisa de Abrego, a free black domestic servant from Seville and Miguel Rodríguez, a white Segovian conquistador in 1565 in St. Augustine (Spanish Florida), is the first known and recorded Christian marriage anywhere in the continental United States.

Long lists of different terms found in casta paintings do not appear in official documentation or anywhere outside these paintings. Only counts of Spaniards, mestizos, black peoples and mulattoes, and indigenes (indios), were recorded in censuses.

== Casta paintings of the 18th century ==
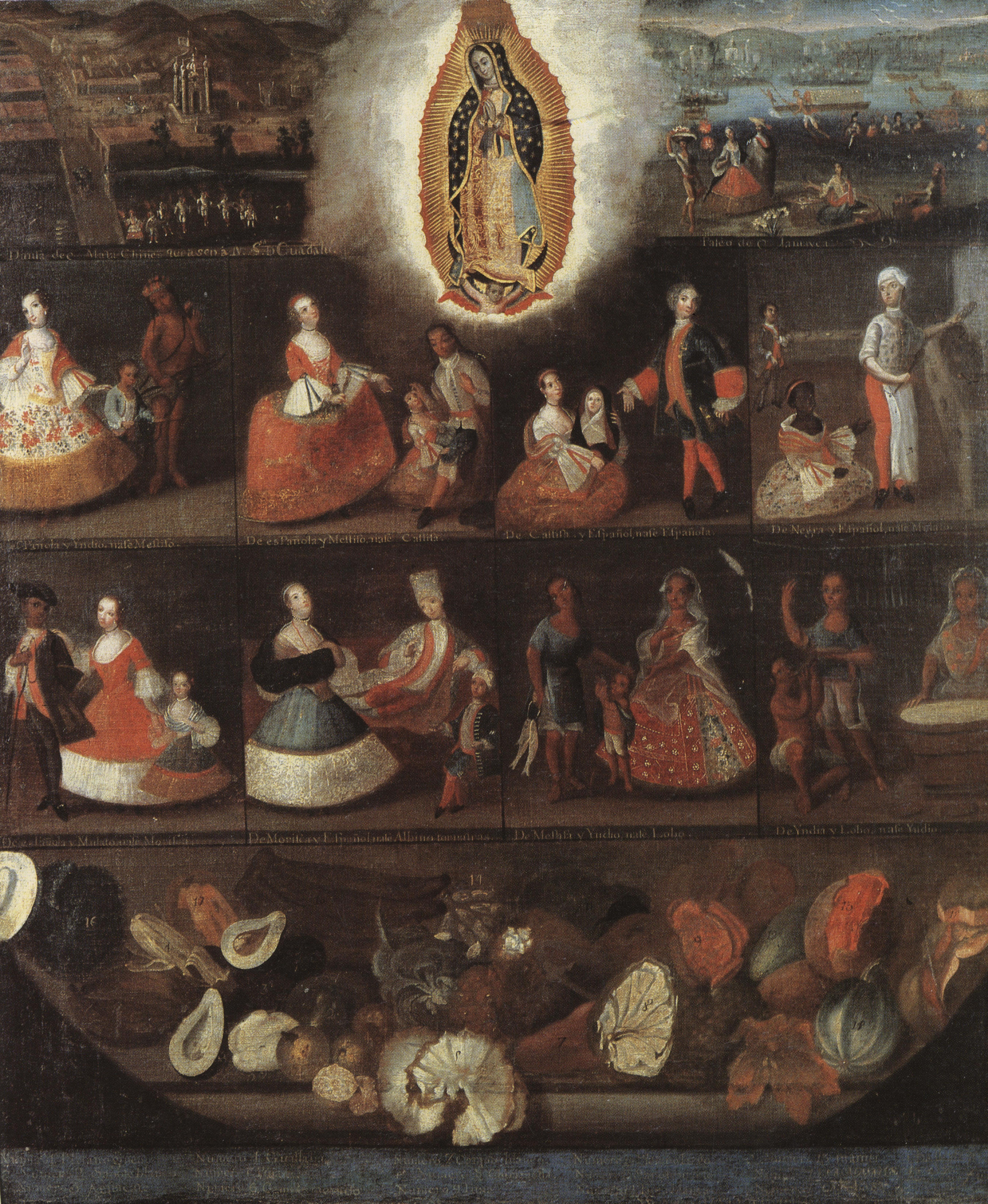
Luis de Mena, Virgin of Guadalupe and castas, 1750. Museo de América, Madrid

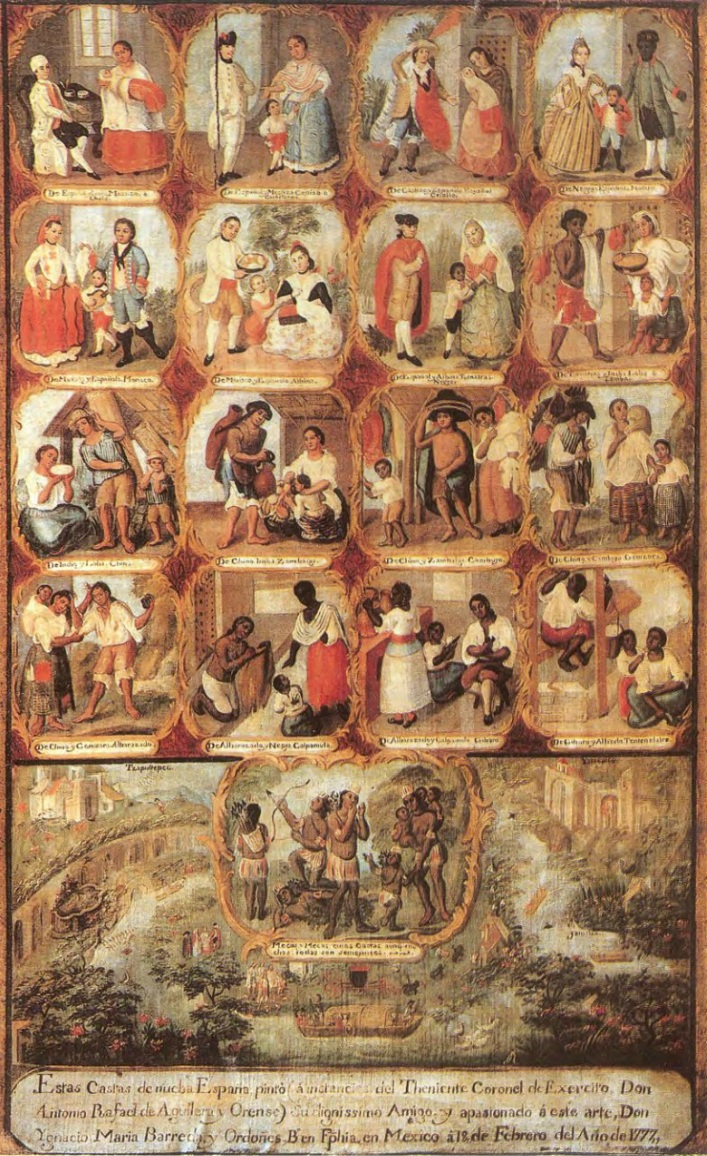
Casta painting showing 16 hierarchically arranged, mixed-race groupings, with indios mecos set outside of the orderly set of "civilized" society. Ignacio Maria Barreda, 1777. Real Academia Española de la Lengua, Madrid

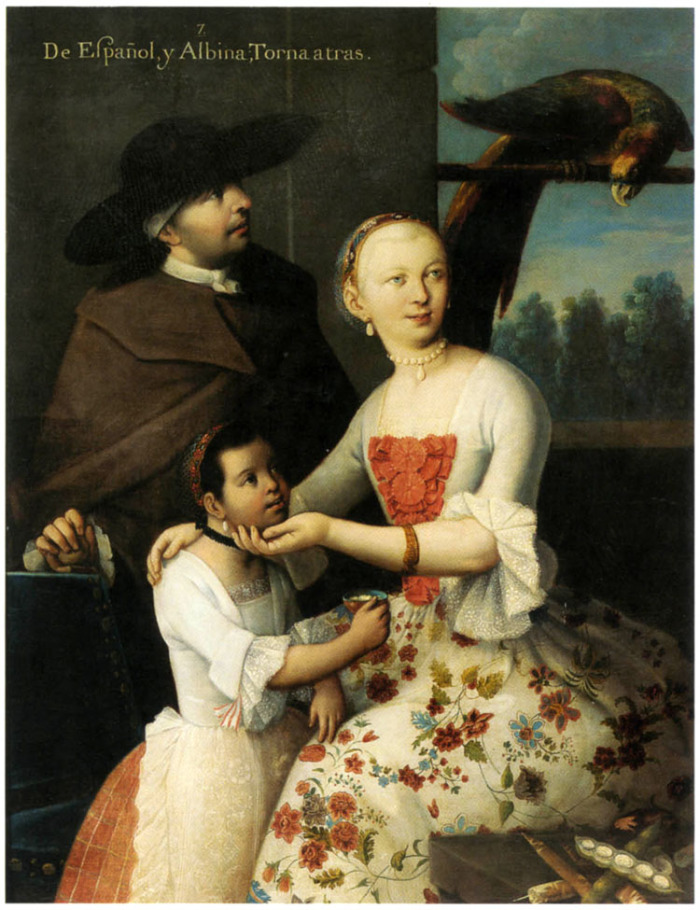
Spanish father and Albina mother, Torna atrás. Miguel Cabrera, 18th-century Mexico

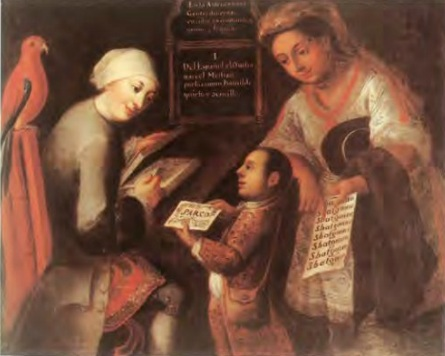
José Joaquín Magón. From a Spaniard and an Indian, a Mestizo child. "Born of the Spaniard and the Indian is a Mestizo, who is generally humble, tranquil, and straightforward." Museo de Antropología, Madrid. 115 x 141 cm

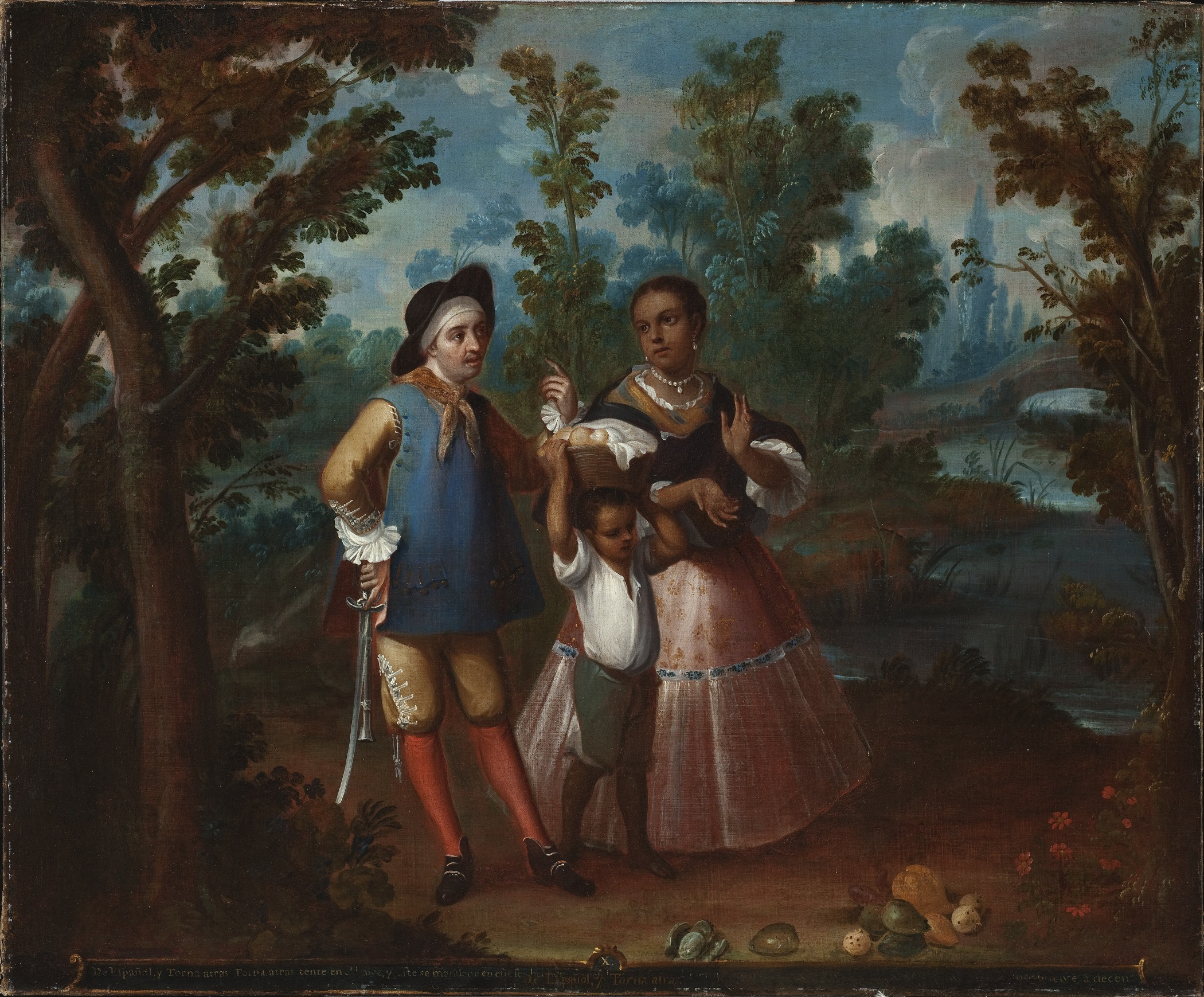
Spanish father, Torna atrás mother, Tente en el aire ("floating in mid air") offspring.

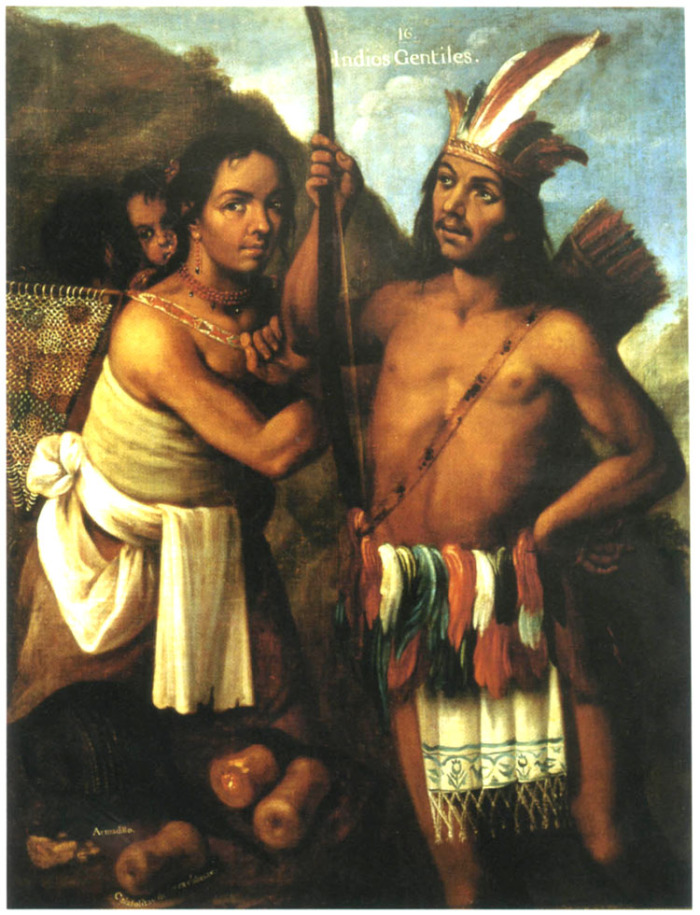
Indios Gentiles. Miguel Cabrera.

Artwork created mainly in 18th-century Mexico purports to show race mixture as a hierarchy. These paintings have had tremendous influence in how scholars have approached difference in the colonial era, but should not be taken as definitive description of racial difference. For approximately a century, casta paintings were by elite artists for an elite viewership. They ceased to be produced following Mexico's independence in 1821 when casta designations were abolished. The vast majority of casta paintings were produced in Mexico, by a variety of artists, with a single group of canvases clearly identified for 18th-century Peru. In the colonial era, artists primarily created religious art and portraits, but in the 18th century, casta paintings emerged as a completely secular genre of art. An exception to that is the painting by Luis de Mena, a single canvas that has the central figure of the Virgin of Guadalupe and a set of casta groupings. Most sets of casta paintings have 16 separate canvases, but a few, such as Mena's, Ignacio María Barreda, and the anonymous painting in the Museo de Virreinato in Tepozotlan, Mexico, are frequently reproduced as examples of the genre, likely because their composition gives a single, tidy image of the racial classification (from the elite viewpoint).

It is unclear why casta paintings emerged as a genre, why they became such a popular genre of artwork, who commissioned them, and who collected them. One scholar suggests they can be seen as "proud renditions of the local," at a point when American-born Spaniards began forming a clearer identification with their place of birth rather than metropolitan Spain. The single-canvas casta artwork could well have been as a curiosity or souvenir for Spaniards to take home to Spain; two frequently reproduced casta paintings are Mena's and Barreda's, both of which are in Madrid museums. There is only one set of casta paintings definitively done in Peru, commissioned by Viceroy Manuel Amat y Junyent (1770), and sent to Spain for the Cabinet of Natural History of the Prince of Asturias.

The influence of the European Enlightenment on the Spanish empire led to an interest in organizing knowledge and scientific description might have resulted in the commission of many series of pictures that document the racial combinations that existed in Spanish territories in the Americas. Many sets of these paintings still exist (around one hundred complete sets in museums and private collections and many more individual paintings), of varying artistic quality, usually consisting of sixteen paintings representing as many racial combinations. It must be emphasized that these paintings reflected the views of the economically established Criollo society and officialdom, but not all Criollos were pleased with casta paintings. One remarked that they show "what harms us, not what benefits us, what dishonors us, not what ennobles us." Many paintings are in Spain in major museums, but many remain in private collections in Mexico, perhaps commissioned and kept because they show the character of late colonial Mexico and a source of pride.

Some of the earliest identified casta paintings were painted c. 1715 by Juan Rodríguez Juárez under a commission from the viceroy of New Spain, Fernando de Alencastre, 1st Duke of Linares, who was interested in delineating racial categories. These are predated by four 1711 paintings by Manuel de Arellano of an unidentified mixed-race young woman and of Chichimeca men and women that may be considered precursors to the casta painting genre.

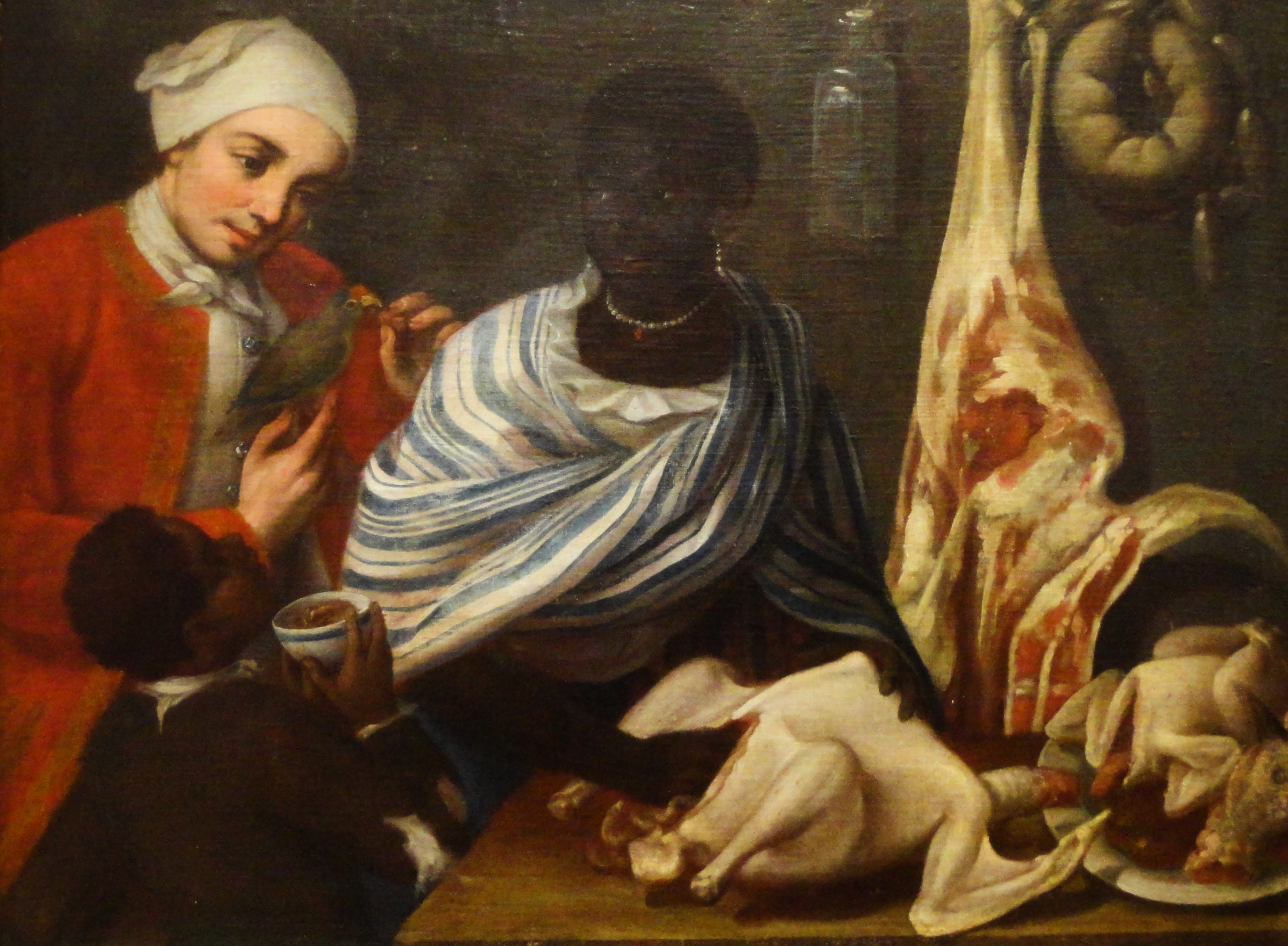
Black and Spanish, comes out mulatto

Some of the finer sets were done by prominent Mexican artists, such as José de Alcíbar, Miguel Cabrera, José de Ibarra, José Joaquín Magón, (who painted two sets); Juan Patricio Morlete Ruiz, José de Páez, and Juan Rodríguez Juárez. One of Magón's sets includes descriptions of the "character and moral standing" of his subjects. These artists worked together in the painting guilds of New Spain. They were important transitional artists in 18th-century casta painting. At least one Spaniard, Francisco Clapera, also contributed to the casta genre. In general, little is known of most artists who did sign their work; most casta paintings are unsigned.

Certain authors have interpreted the overall theme of these paintings as representing the "supremacy of the Spaniards", the possibility that mixtures of Spaniards and Spanish-Indian offspring could return to the status of Spaniards through marriage to Spaniards over generations, what can be considered "restoration of racial purity," or "racial mending" was seen visually in many sets of casta paintings. It was also articulated by a visitor to Mexico, Don Pedro Alonso O'Crouley, in 1774. "If the mixed-blood is the offspring of a Spaniard and an Indian, the stigma [of race mixture] disappears at the third step in descent because it is held as systematic that a Spaniard and an Indian produce a mestizo; a mestizo and a Spaniard, a castizo; and a castizo and a Spaniard, a Spaniard. The admixture of Indian blood should not indeed be regarded as a blemish, since the provisions of law give the Indian all that he could wish for, and Philip II granted to mestizos the privilege of becoming priests. On this consideration is based the common estimation of descent from a union of Indian and European or creole Spaniard."

O'Crouley says that the same process of restoration of racial purity does not occur over generations for European-black African offspring marrying whites. "From the union of a Spaniard and a Negro the mixed-blood retains the stigma for generations without losing the original quality of a mulato." Casta paintings show increasing whitening over generations with the mixes of Spaniards and black Africans. The sequence is the offspring of a Spaniard + Negra, Mulatto; Spaniard with a Mulatta, Morisco; Spaniard with a Morisca, Albino (a racial category, derived from Alba, "white"); Spaniard with an Albina, Torna atrás, or "throw back" black. Negro, Mulatto, and Morisco were labels found in colonial-era documentation, but Albino and Torna atrás exist only as fairly standard categories in casta paintings.

In contrast, mixtures with black people, both by Indians and Spaniards, led to a bewildering number of combinations, with "fanciful terms" to describe them. Instead of leading to a new racial type or equilibrium, they led to apparent disorder. Terms such as the above-mentioned tente en el aire ("floating in midair") and no te entiendo ("I don't understand you")—and others based on terms used for animals: coyote and lobo (wolf).

Castas defined themselves in different ways, and how they were recorded in official records was a process of negotiation between the casta and the person creating the document, whether it was a birth certificate, a marriage certificate or a court deposition. In real life, many casta individuals were assigned different racial categories in different documents, revealing the malleable nature of racial identity in colonial, Spanish American society.

Some paintings depicted the supposed "innate" character and quality of people because of their birth and ethnic origin. For example, according to one painting by José Joaquín Magón, a mestizo (mixed Indian + Spanish) was considered generally humble, tranquil, and straightforward. Another painting claims "from Lobo and Indian woman is born the Cambujo, one usually slow, lazy, and cumbersome." Ultimately, the casta paintings are reminders of the colonial biases in modern human history that linked a casta/ethnic society based on descent, skin color, social status, and one's birth.

Often, casta paintings depicted commodity items from Latin America like pulque, the fermented alcohol drink of the lower classes. Painters depicted interpretations of pulque that were attributed to specific castas.

The Indias in casta paintings depict them as partners to Spaniards, black people, and castas, and thus part of Hispanic society. But in a number of casta paintings, they are also shown apart from "civilized society", such as Miguel Cabrera's Indios Gentiles, or indios bárbaros or Chichimecas, barely clothed Indians in a wild setting. In the single-canvas casta painting by José María Barreda, there are a canonical 16 casta groupings and then in a separate cell below are "Mecos". Although the so-called "barbarian Indians" (indios bárbaros) were fierce warriors on horseback, indios in casta paintings are not shown as bellicose, but as weak, a trope that developed in the colonial era.

A casta painting by Luis de Mena that is often reproduced as an example of the genre shows an unusual couple with a pale, well-dressed Spanish woman paired with a nearly naked Indio, producing a Mestizo offspring. "The aberrant combination not only mocks social protocol but also seems to underscore the very artificiality of a casta system that pretends to circumscribe social fluidity and economic mobility." The image "would have seemed frankly bizarre and offensive by eighteenth-century Creole elites, if taken literally", but if the pair were considered allegorical figures, the Spanish woman represents "Europe" and the indio "America." The image "functions as an allegory for the 'civilizing' and Christianizing process."

=== Sample sets of casta paintings ===
Presented here are casta lists from three sets of paintings. Note that they only agree on the first five combinations, which are essentially the Indian-white ones. There is no agreement on the black mixtures, however. Also, no one list should be taken as "authoritative". These terms would have varied from region to region and across time periods. The lists here probably reflect the names that the artist knew or preferred, the ones the patron requested to be painted, or a combination of both.

Miguel Cabrera, 1763
Andrés de Islas, 1774
Anonymous (Museo del Virreinato)
1. De Español y d'India; Mestiza
2. De español y Mestiza, Castiza
3. De Español y Castiza, Español
4. De Español y Negra, Mulata
5. De Español y Mulata; Morisca
6. De Español y Morisca; Albina
7. De Español y Albina; Torna atrás
8. De Español y Torna atrás; Tente en el aire
9. De Negro y d'India, China cambuja.
10. De Chino cambujo y d'India; Loba
11. De Lobo y d'India, Albarazado
12. De Albarazado y Mestiza, Barcino
13. De Indio y Barcina; Zambuigua
14. De Castizo y Mestiza; Chamizo
15. De Mestizo y d'India; Coyote
16. Indios gentiles (Heathen Indians)
1. De Español e India, nace Mestizo
2. De Español y Mestiza, nace Castizo
3. De Castizo y Española, nace Española
4. De Español y Negra, nace Mulata
5. De Español y Mulata, nace Morisco
6. De Español y Morisca, nace Albino
7. De Español y Albina, nace Torna atrás
8. De Indio y Negra, nace Lobo
9. De Indio y Mestiza, nace Coyote
10. De Lobo y Negra, nace Chino
11. De Chino e India, nace Cambujo
12. De Cambujo e India, nace Tente en el aire
13. De Tente en el aire y Mulata, nace Albarazado
14. De Albarazado e India, nace Barcino
15. De Barcino y Cambuja, nace Calpamulato
16. Indios Mecos bárbaros (Barbarian Meco Indians)
1. Español con India, Mestizo
2. Mestizo con Española, Castizo
3. Castiza con Español, Española
4. Español con Negra, Mulato
5. Mulato con Española, Morisca
6. Morisco con Española, Chino
7. Chino con India, Salta atrás
8. Salta atras con Mulata, Lobo
9. Lobo con China, Gíbaro (Jíbaro)
10. Gíbaro con Mulata, Albarazado
11. Albarazado con Negra, Cambujo
12. Cambujo con India, Sambiaga (Zambiaga)
13. Sambiago con Loba, Calpamulato
14. Calpamulto con Cambuja, Tente en el aire
15. Tente en el aire con Mulata, No te entiendo
16. No te entiendo con India, Torna atrás

=== Casta paintings ===
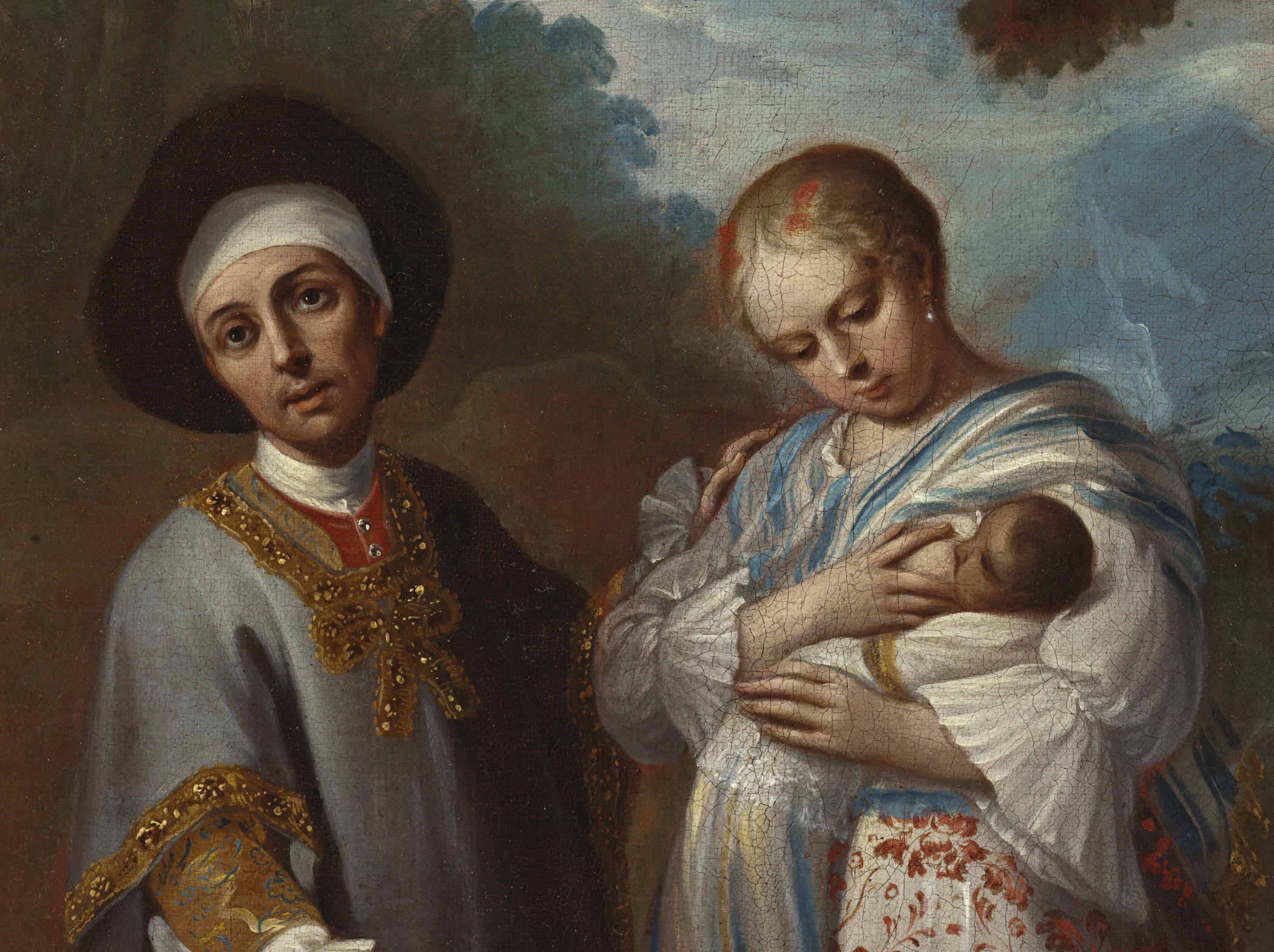
De español, Alvina, Torna atrás (cropped), c. 1760. Juan Patricio Morlete Ruiz.

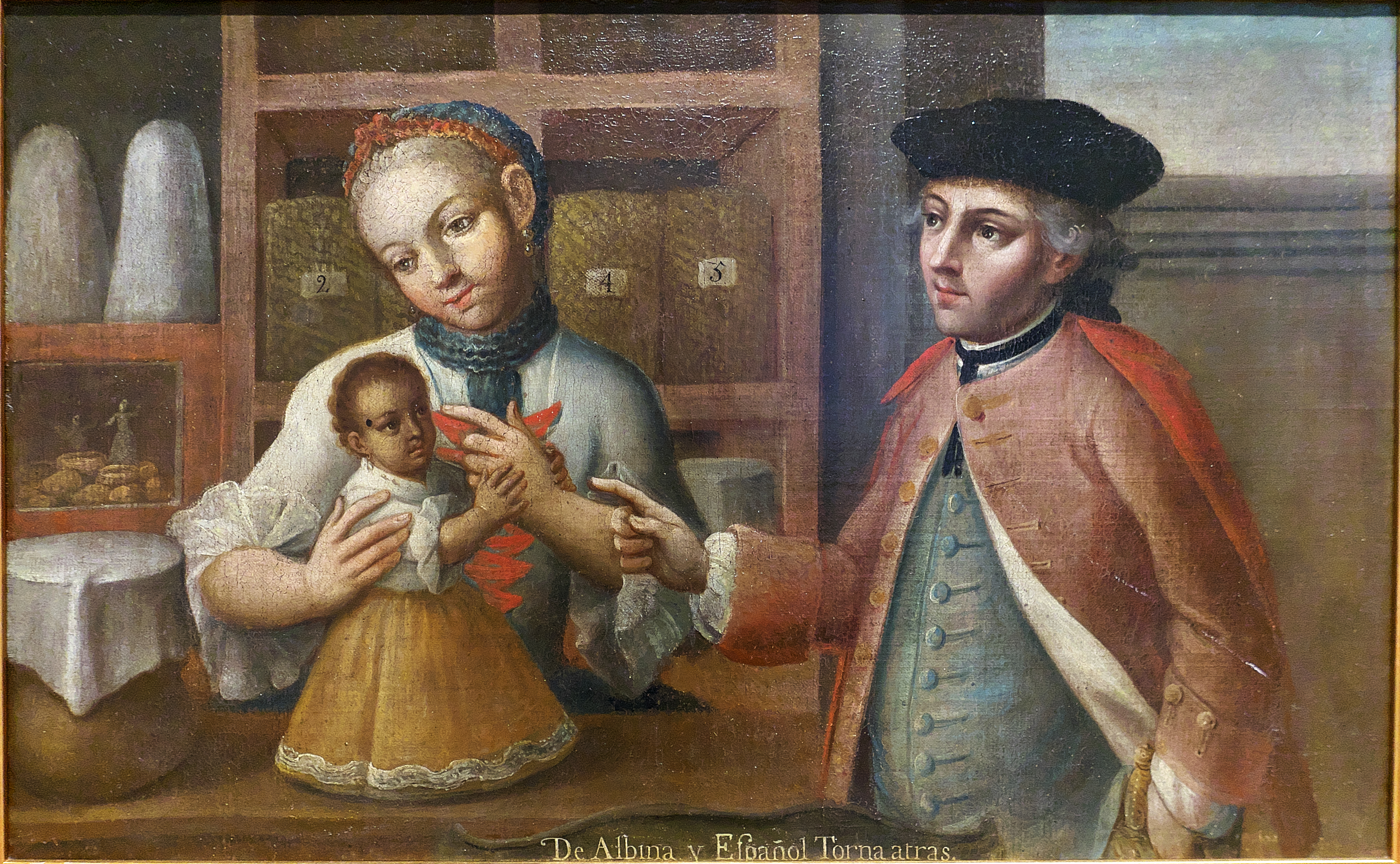
De Albina y Español, Torna atrás, c. 1750. Juan Patricio Morlete Ruiz (attributed).

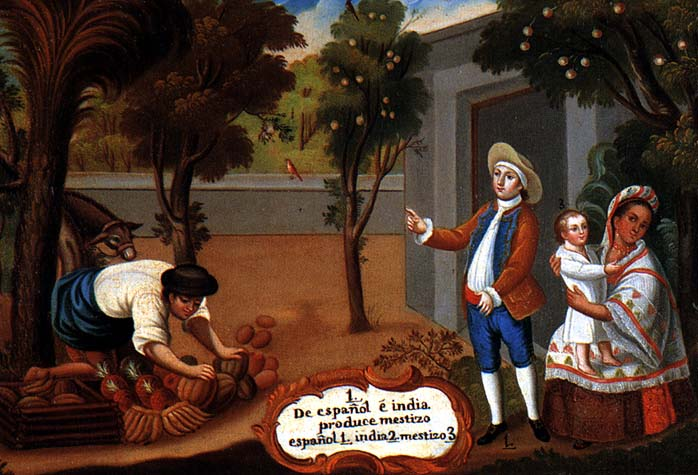
De español e india, produce mestizo (From a Spanish man and an Indian woman, a Mestizo is produced), c. 1780. Unknown.

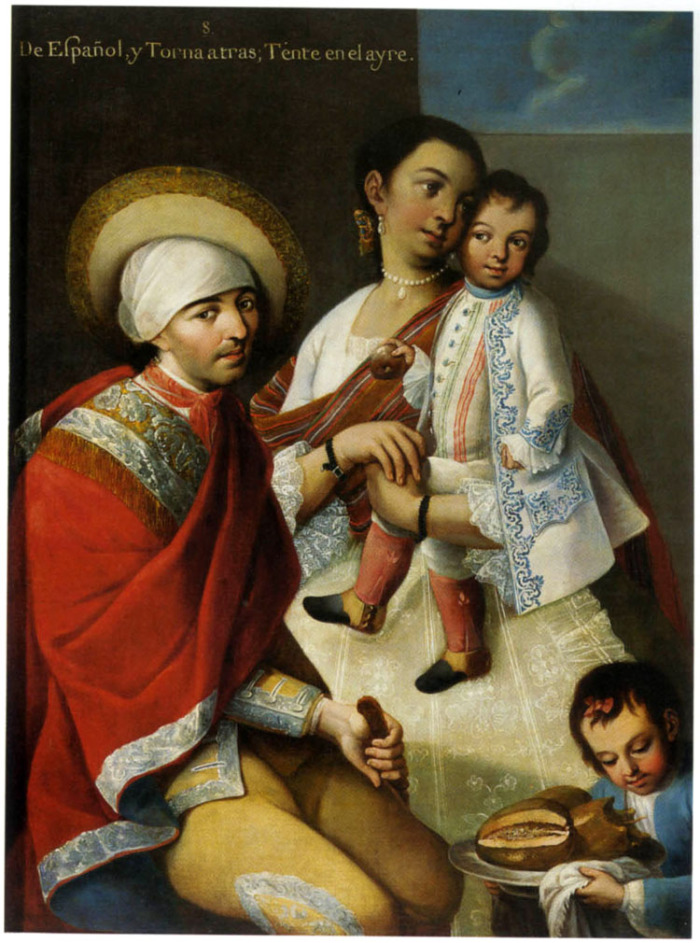
Spaniard and Torna atrás, Tente en el aire, 1763. Miguel Cabrera.

De mestizo e india, sale coiote (From a Mestizo man and an Indian woman, a Cholo is begotten), c. 1780. Unknown.

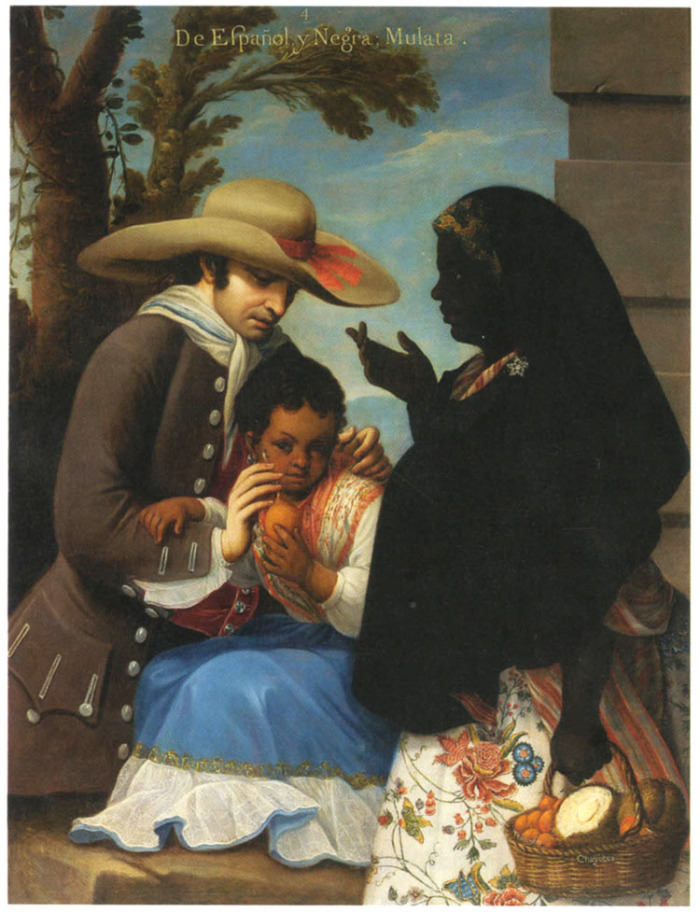
Spaniard + Negra, Mulatto, 1763. Miguel Cabrera.

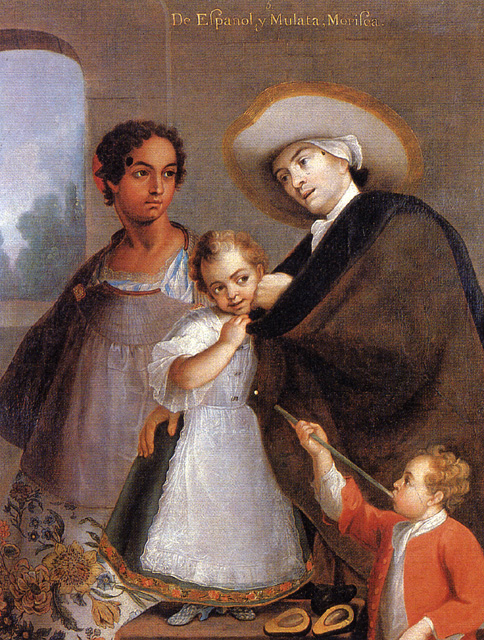
De español y mulata, morisca, 1763. Miguel Cabrera.

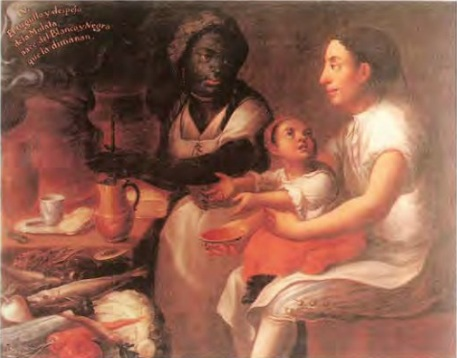
La Mulata "The pride and ease of the mulatta come from the white and the black that originate her." c. 1780, José Joaquín Magón.

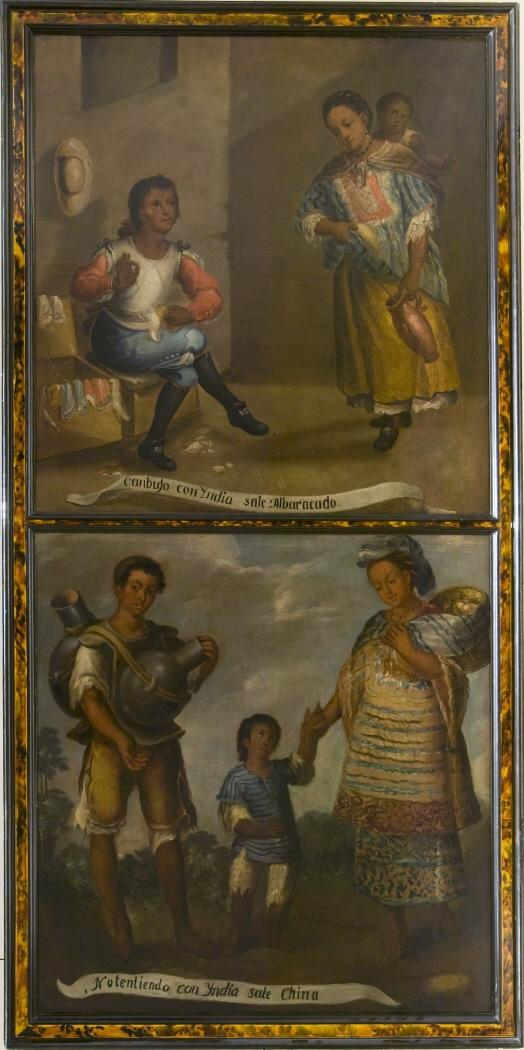
Canbujo con Yndia sale Albaracado / Notentiendo con Yndia sale China, c. 1775. Luis Berrueco

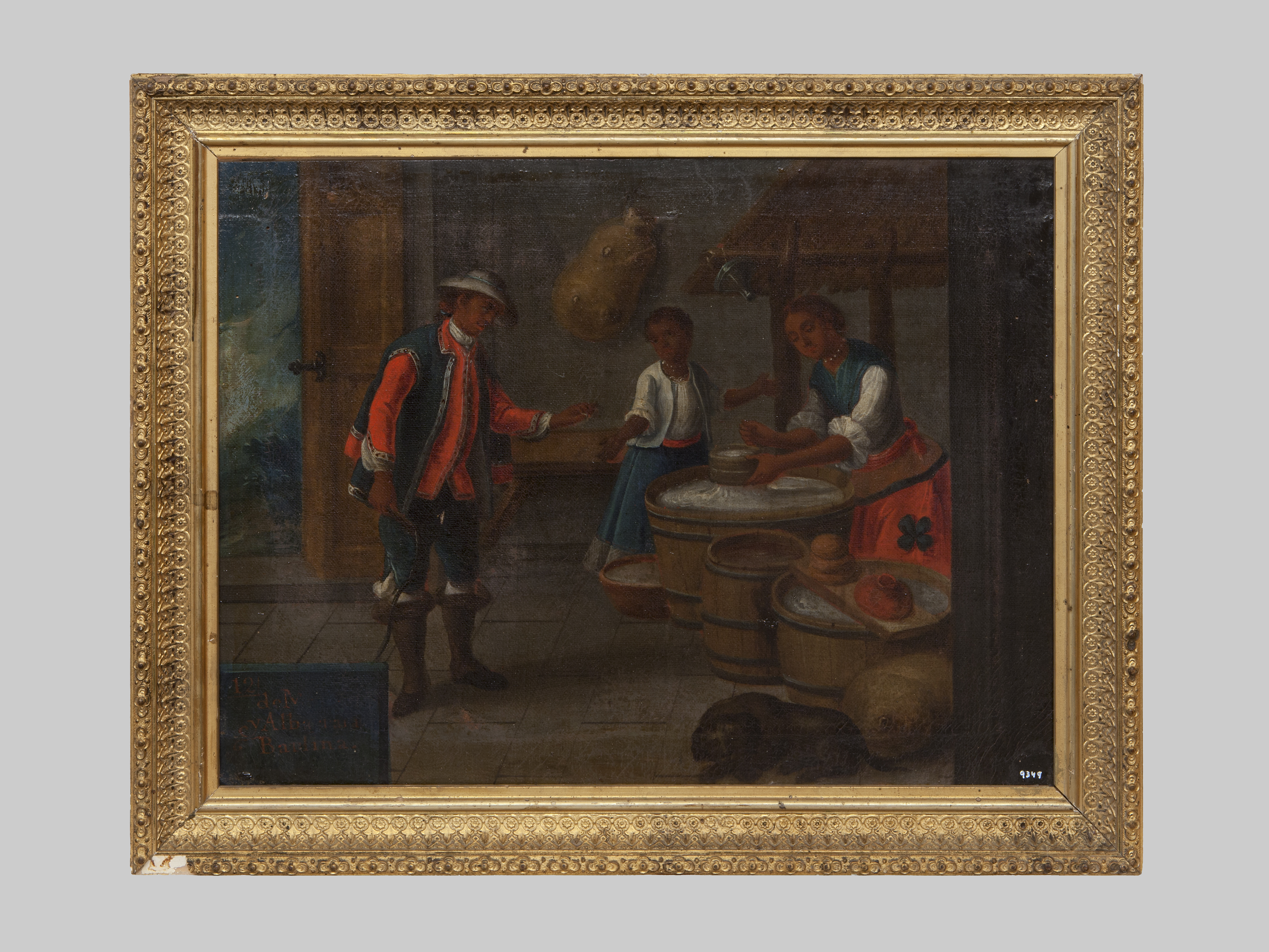
De Mestizo y Albarazada, Barsina, c. 1799. Unknown.

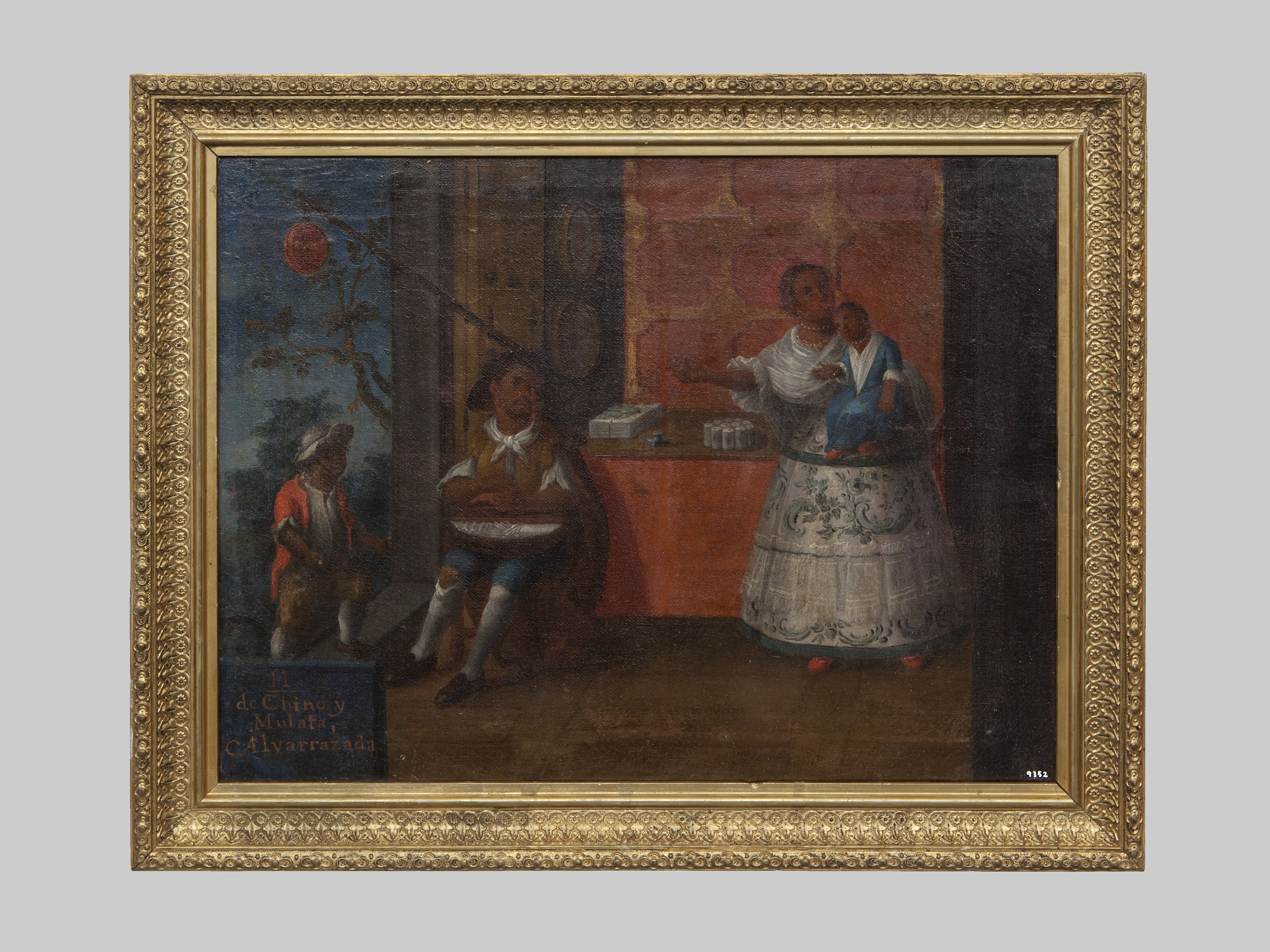
De Chino y Mulata, Alvarazada, c. 1799. Unknown.

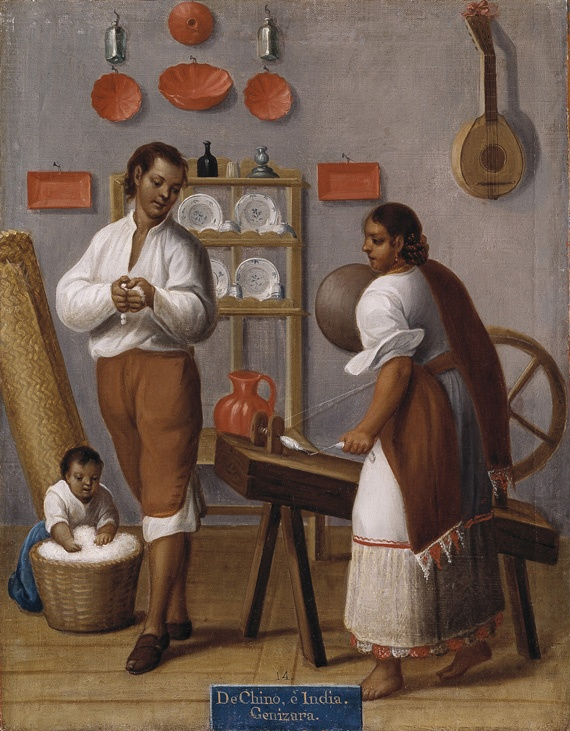
De Chino, e India. Genizara, c. 1775. Francisco Clapera

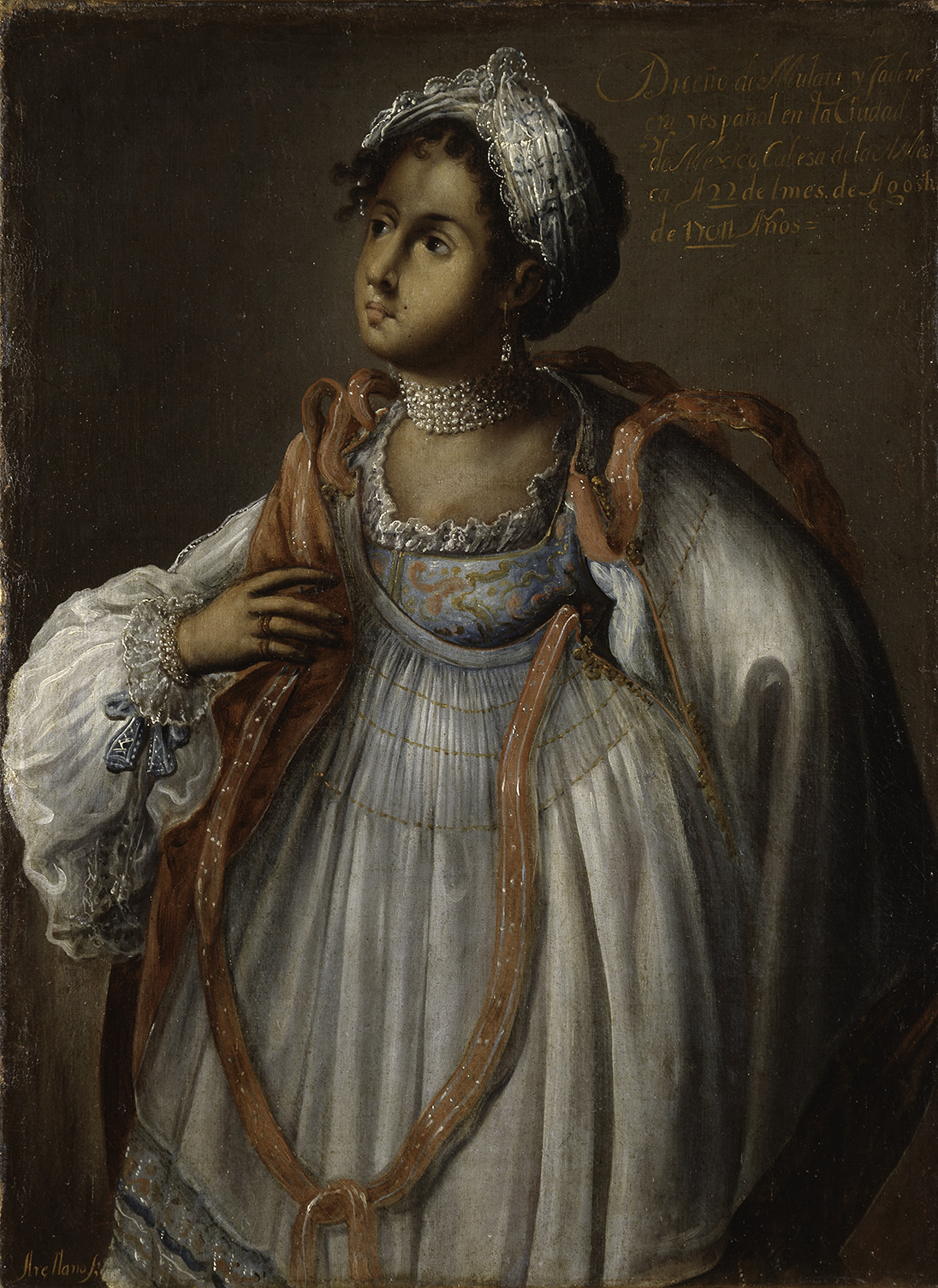
Diceño de Mulata (1711). Manuel de Arellano

== See also ==
- Caste
- Castizo
- Dominant minority
- Filipino Mestizos
- Mexican art
- Ordenanzas del Baratillo de México
- Race and ethnicity in Latin America
- La Raza
- Zambo
