= Francisco Clapera =

Spanish artist

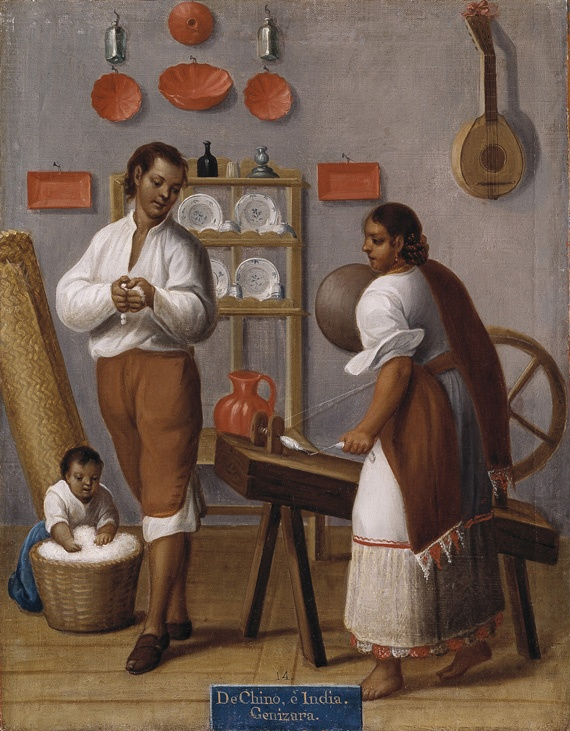
From chino (the male offspring of a barcino and a mulata) and an indigenous woman: a 'genizara'. Denver Museum of Art.

Francisco Clapera (1746–1810) was a Spanish painter who after training in Spain lived and worked in New Spain. Here he created casta paintings, a distinctive Mexican genre that depicts in sets of consecutive images scenes of racial mixing among the Indians, Spaniards and Africans who lived in the Spanish colony.

== Life and Art ==
Born in Barcelona, Clapera traveled to Peru on a ship headed by Viceroy Manuel Guiror. After his arriving in Peru, Clapera traveled to Mexico. There, he met Jeronimo Antonio Gil, the first director of the Royal Academy of San Carlos. Gil, wanting Clapera to become part of his Academy, convinced him to stay in Mexico.

=== Casta Paintings ===
As a Spaniard living in the New World, Clapera's experience at the Academia de San Fernando in Madrid made him unique. His incorporation of European artistic techniques, such as the contrapposto, made his casta paintings more dynamic than those of his Mexican contemporaries. Ilona Katzew, art historian and author of Casta Painting: Images of Race in Eighteenth-Century Mexico, noted that Clapera was one of the few artists who painted a series of castas.

His paintings also incorporated aspects of Colonial Mexican life. Images of dancing, drunkenness and domestic abuse further developed the casta painting genre to appear more dynamic, compared to earlier castas, which were strict in their portrait-like compositions.

== See also ==
- Mexican art
