= Ordenanzas del Baratillo de México =

1754 manuscript from Mexico

An unpublished manuscript entitled Ordenanzas del Baratillo de México (Decrees of the Baratillo of Mexico) was signed and dated in 1754 by Pedro Anselmo Chreslos Jache, likely a pseudonym for an educated Spaniard. It is a satirical piece of eighteenth-century colonial literature written in New Spain (modern day Mexico), which sought to offer an alternative view of life in colonial Spanish America.

== Content ==
The Baratillo was an infamous market in Mexico City known for the sale of used items, many of which had been stolen and were cheaply priced. It was a place for the poor and lower class of Mexico, usually racially mixed people, to mingle and purchase items for subsistence.

Ordenanzas, or official decrees, were established to regulate New Spanish society in general. The author's 377 ordenanzas mimicked the official statutes, but would completely reverse the power system based on the sistema de castas. In effect, Chreslos Jache mocks the limpieza de sangre by creating a separate system of classification for Spaniards. For example, “medio Españoles” (half-Spanish) and “cuartilla de Español” (one-quarter Spanish) were parodies of terms to identify persons of mixed race, like mestizo, castiza, lobo, and others.

The purpose of this manuscript was to show a chaotic view of life in Mexico in which the castas used a variety of strategies to substantiate their control over society and that the casta system itself is self-regulating. Chreslos Jache pokes fun at this idea of self-regulation by making up ridiculous names that are impossible to adequately translate for the terminology of the sistema de castas. The manuscript states that the sistema de castas was also mocked by the formation of the Baratillo “brotherhood” which was composed exclusively of non-whites, mainly mulattos. This brotherhood banned membership to Spaniards and their descendants, and instead made them targets of the brotherhood's scams. By using the Baratillo brotherhood, Chreslos Jache inverts the traditional racial attitude of the time where Spaniards and creoles dominated the system.

== Impact ==
The manuscript reinforced race as a category of power differentiation within New Spain because it was a text that circulated among the educated elite in a time when primarily upper-class people were literate. The significance of this satirical manuscript in relation to Casta paintings is that, much like the manuscript, the paintings reflect racial debate and also contribute to the interpretation of racial culture during the second half of the eighteenth-century in New Spain.
