= Juan Patricio Morlete Ruiz =

Mexican painter

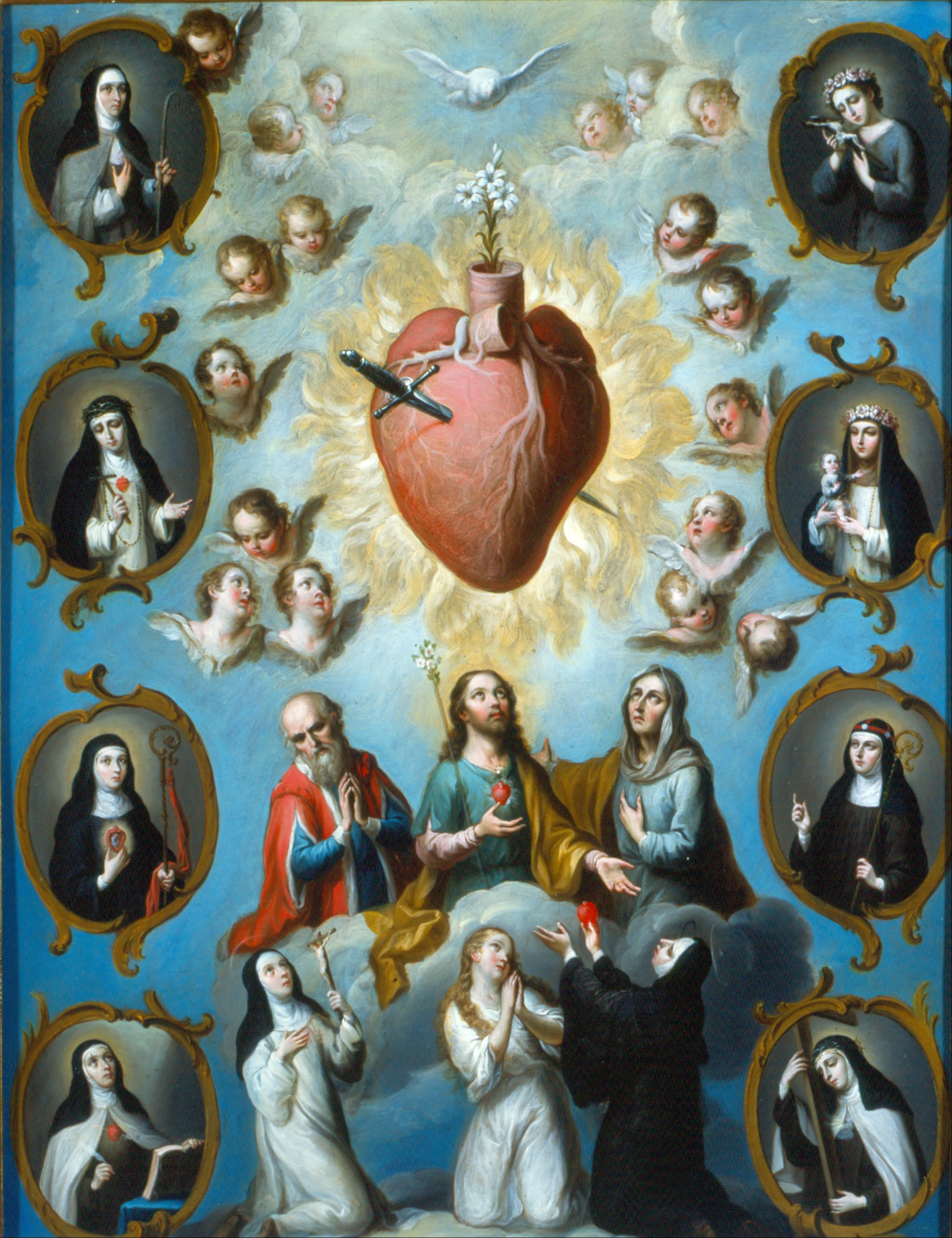
Morlete Ruiz, The Heart of Mary

Juan Patricio Morlete Ruiz (San Miguel de Allende, 1713–1772, Mexico City) was an 18th-century Mexican painter, a mestizo according to the system of racial classification. He is most well known for his casta paintings.

Born in 1713 in San Miguel de Allende, he was a contemporary of Miguel Cabrera. Both artists were important to Casta painting and are accredited with many iconic elements of Casta painting that influenced the genre for decades after them. Like many artists in Colonial New Spain, he was a member of painting academy that was established in the mid-eighteenth century. This status gave Morlete a place among the Spanish elite in Mexico. It is evident from documents at the time that both the Viceroy Carlos Francisco De Croix and Viceroy Antonio María de Bucareli y Ursúa commissioned work from him.

Morlete Ruiz's paintings are significant to Mexican art history because Morlete Ruiz was one of the first artists to employ what would become standard elements of 18th century Casta painting. In his Casta sets, much could be determined about the status of the subjects based on their clothing, hair, and surroundings. His paintings featured the Spanish men as the dominant figures in the family. He also used body language to express attitudes and emotions that supposedly resulted from racial mixing.

Apart from Casta painting, Morlete Ruiz followed the trend of exoticism by painting local flora and fauna, especially fruits to show a Spanish audience the bounty of the New World. Color contrast, sharp detail, and positioning of the figures reflect the influence of Dutch and Flemish genre painting in his work.

Some of Morlete Ruiz's paintings can be seen today at the LA County Museum of Art and the Museo Nacional de Arte of Mexico City.

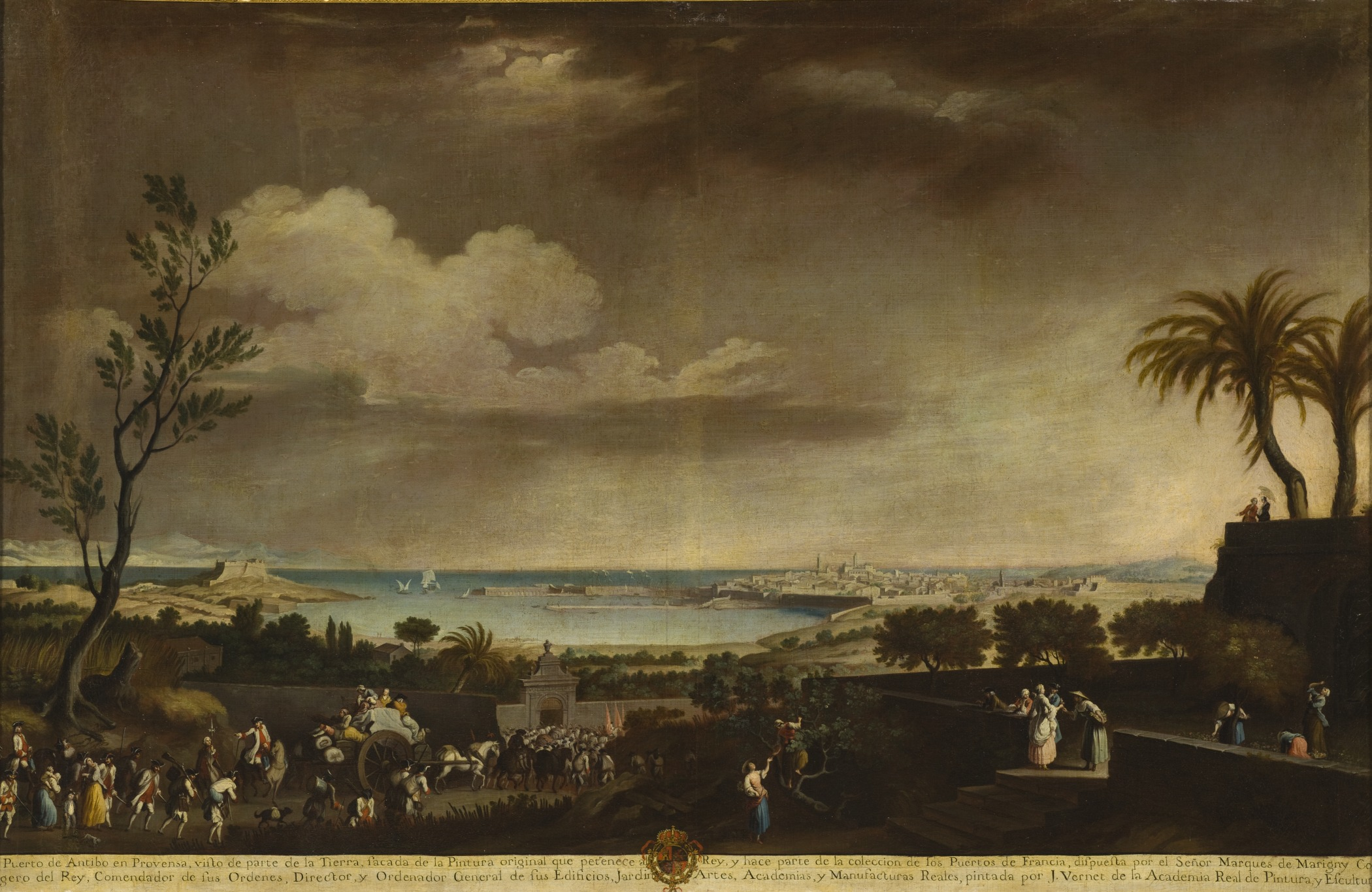
1771 Paintings Oil on canvas Framed

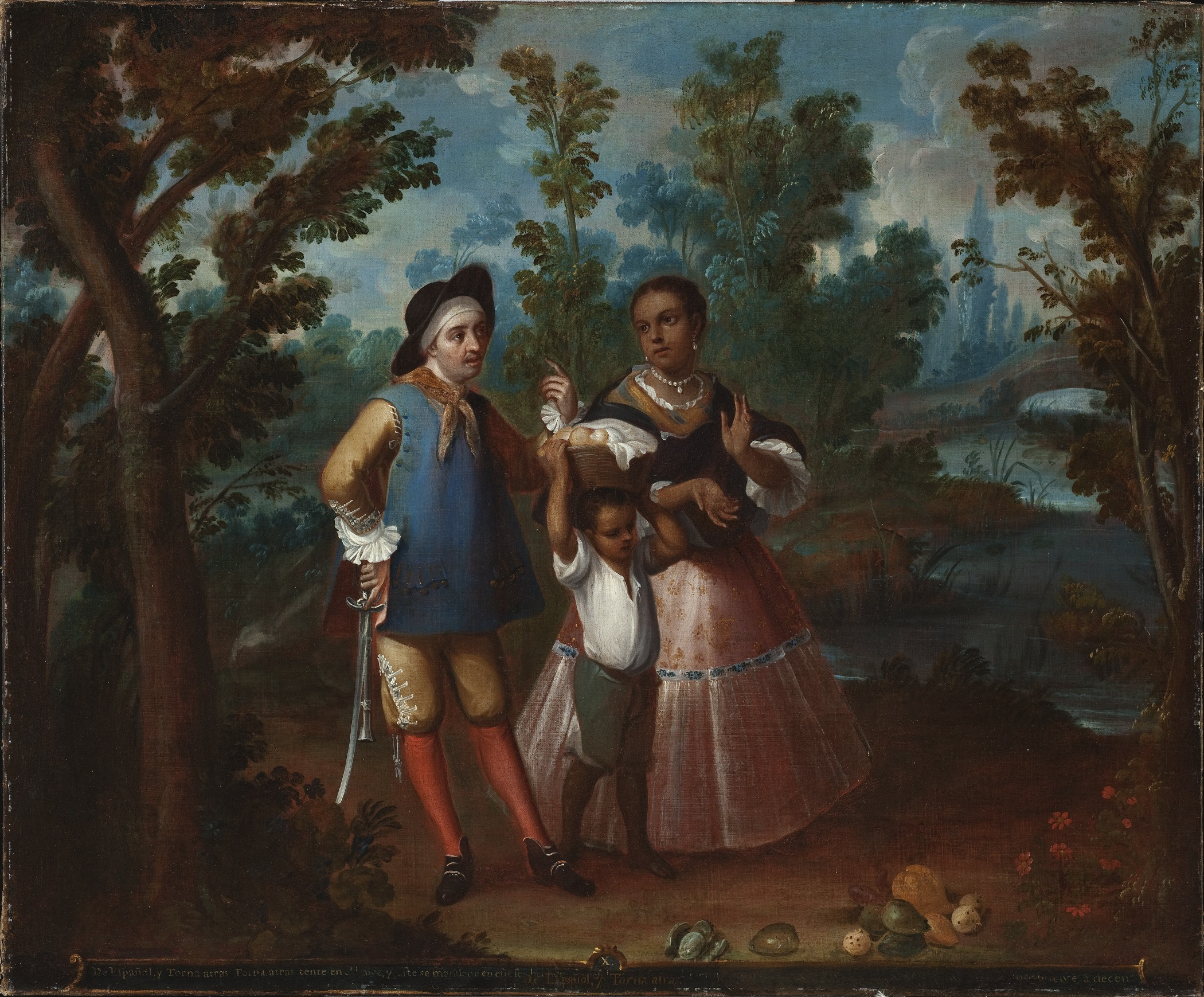
1760 Paintings Oil on canvas Gift of the 2011 Collectors Committee.

== See also ==
- Mexican art
