= Royal Pragmatic on Marriage =

The Royal Pragmatic on Marriage (in Spanish, Real Pragmática) was a form of legislation introduced by the Spanish Crown in order to control the institution of marriage, by requiring children to obtain permission from their parents before marrying, and allowing disinheritance in case of disobedience. The first Royal Pragmatic was passed on 23 March 1776.

The idea behind this legislation is that a family may object if they feel that the future spouse is of unequal social standing. Jeffrey M. Shumway's The Case of the Ugly Suitor and Other Histories of Love, Gender, and Nation in Buenos Aires, 1776-1870 explores the legal backing of this concept through much of Argentina's history.
