= Luis de Mena =

Mexican artist

Luis de Mena was a Mexican artist who lived and worked predominantly in the middle of the eighteenth century. Mena painted religious works and has been described as "no more than a journeyman painter in 18th century Mexico." He signed a work entitled "Most Holy Mother of Light", now on display in the Serra Museum in San Diego, California.

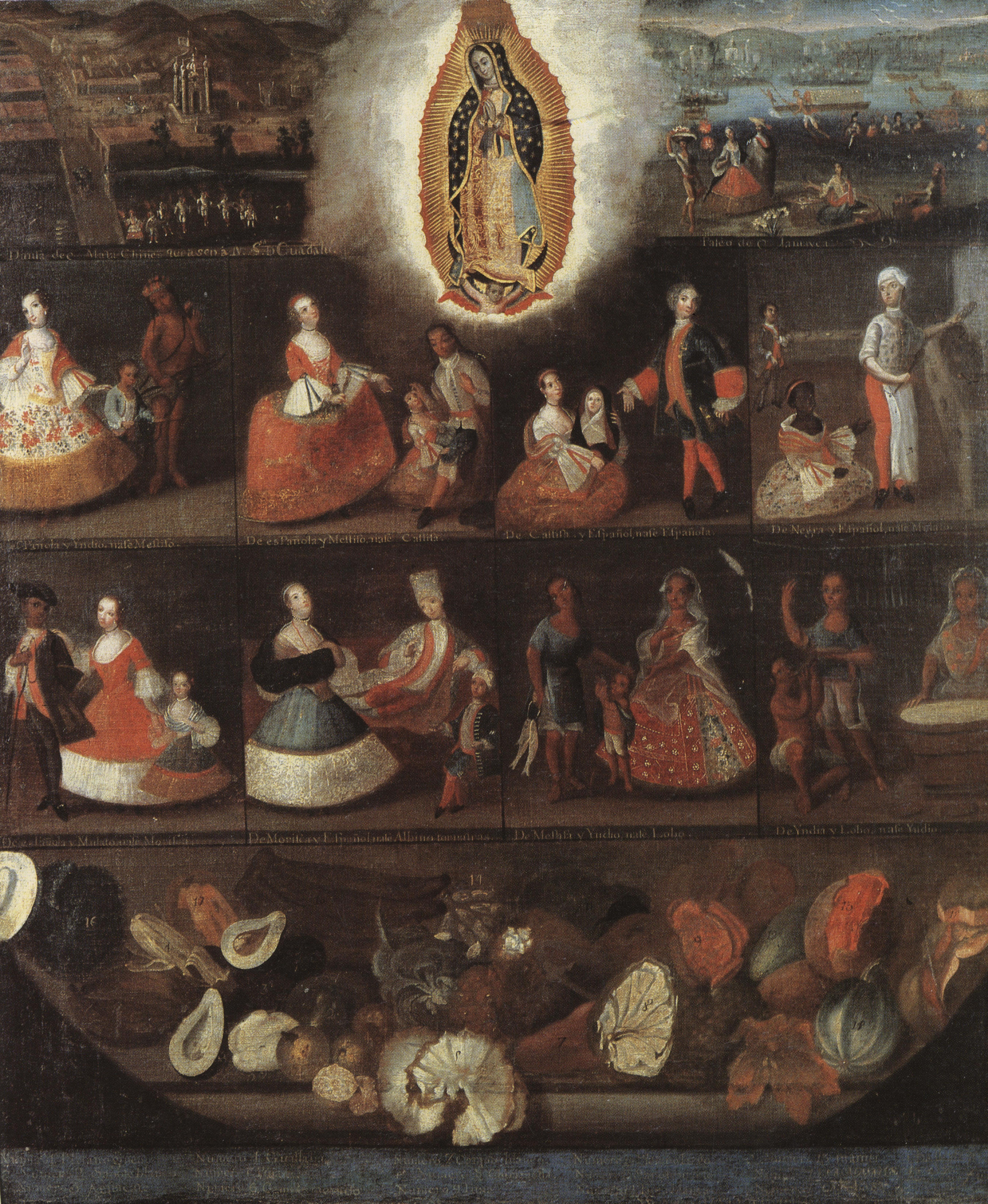
Luis de Mena, Virgin of Guadalupe and castas, 1750

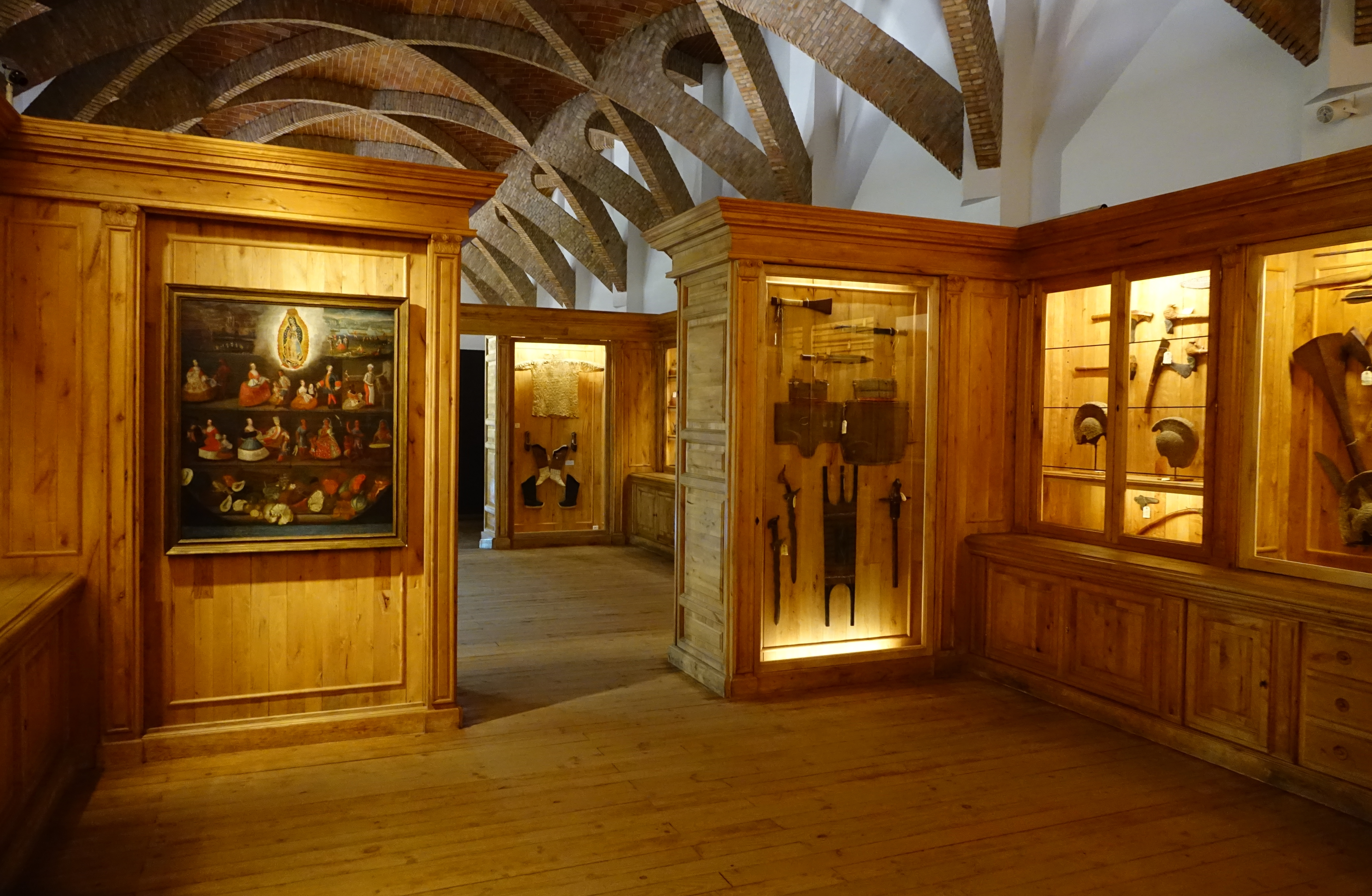
Gallery formerly arranged to recall the Cabinet of Natural History that preceded the museum, with Mena's painting

His most famous painting is in the Museo de América in Madrid, which as of May 2024 is no longer on view. It is much reproduced as an exemplar of the casta painting genre. It is a single-canvas work from 1750 which portrays not only a variety of New Spain’s castas but uniquely features the Virgin of Guadalupe. This painting also shares more common features with others of its kind, including fruits native to Mexico and idealized scenes of daily life in the top and bottom panels.

His paintings are, as a whole, more idealistic, suggesting he belonged to a school of art which emphasized the exotic and paradisiacal elements of New Spain. This approach to casta painting dominated the genre until the Bourbon Reforms of the 1760s.

== Life and background ==
Unfortunately, very few details about de Mena’s life were recorded. His birthplace and date, as well as his own social standing and any specific art school or academy to which he may have belonged to, remain unknown. However, it might be reasonable to speculate that he was a creole or was at least considered legally white due to the strong element of creole pride which was often a hallmark of the genre prior to the 1760s. Mena may also have been a student of, or inspired by, Miguel Cabrera, one of the most famous casta painters. Cabrera had once defended the divinity of the Virgin of Guadalupe, who appears in Mena’s work, and was also a contemporary of de Mena.
