= Lobo (racial category) =

Racial category in the Spanish colonial racial label

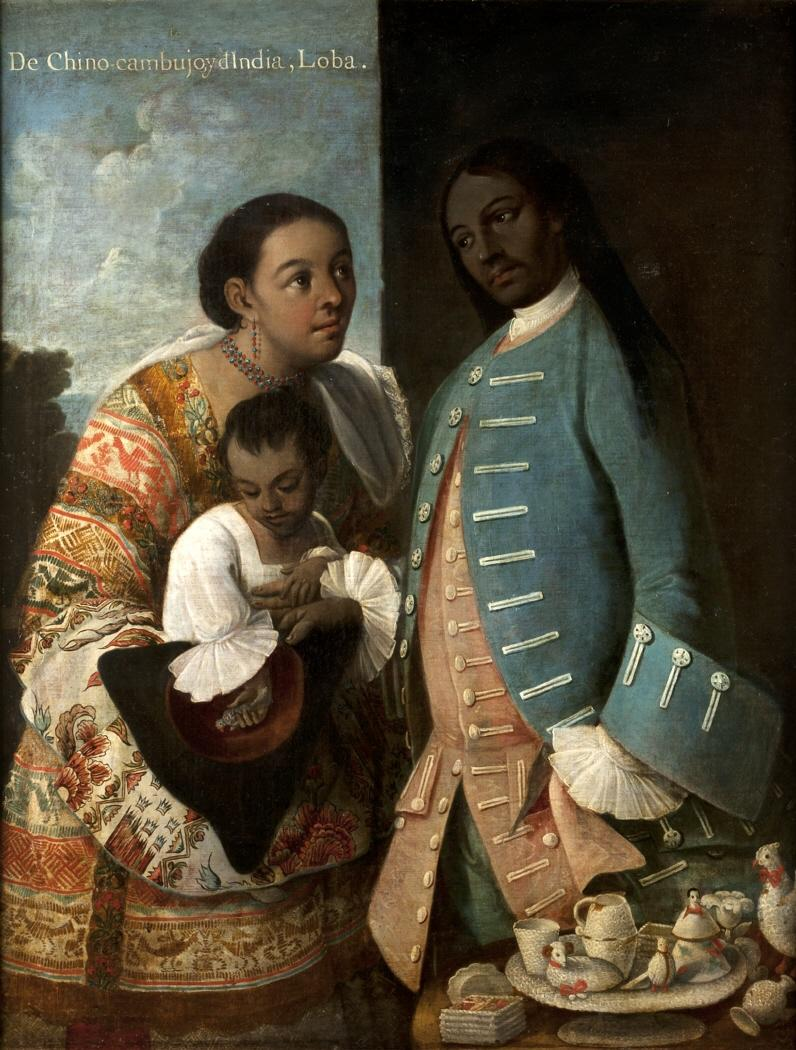
De Chino cambujo e India, Loba. Miguel Cabrera

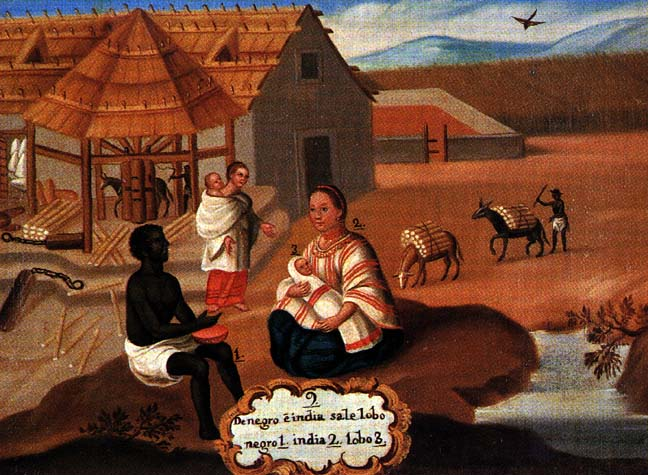
De negro e india, lobo (from a black man and an Amerindian woman, a Lobo is begotten). Anon. 18th c. Mexico

Lobo (fem. Loba) (Spanish for "wolf") is a racial category for a mixed-race person used in Mexican paintings illustrating the caste (casta) system in 17th- and 18th-century Spanish America.

== Definitions ==
Lobo does not have a fixed meaning, with possible parents being a black man and an Indian woman, a Cambujo (African/Amerindian) and an Indian woman, a Torna atrás and an Indian woman, a Mestizo and an Indian woman, or a Salta atrás (of African/European ancestry) and a Mulatto woman.

Lobo was a classification used in official colonial documentation, including the Inquisition trials, marriage registers and censuses. One example of a Loba is a mixed-race woman who came before the Mexican Inquisition; she had been given multiple racial labels. She was publicly known as a China, was known to be a parda (a brown-skinned person), who "looked like a loba", suggesting she had visible African features.

There were regional differences in colonial Mexico for racial labeling. For instance, in Xichú and Casas Viejas, in the Bajío region near Querétaro and the Sierra Gorda mountains, where there were resident indigenous populations, as well as blacks and mulattos, locally the people used lobos as a "normative category".

In his examination of marriage patterns from marital registers, Vinson found no records of lobos marrying each other; brides and grooms thus classified chose partners from other racial categories.

In eighteenth-century casta paintings, lobos are usually shown doing physical work and not lavishly dressed, indicating lower class status. In Joaquín Antonio de Basarás's Origen, costumbres, y estado presente de mexicanos y philipinos (1763), the lobo father is a water carrier, while his Indian wife sells chickens. An early 18th-century set of casta paintings shows the Lobo as the offspring of a Black father and Indigenous mother; in the same set, a Lobo father and an India mother have a dark-skinned child labeled a Lobo Torna atrás, meaning the child more closely resembled the Black father.

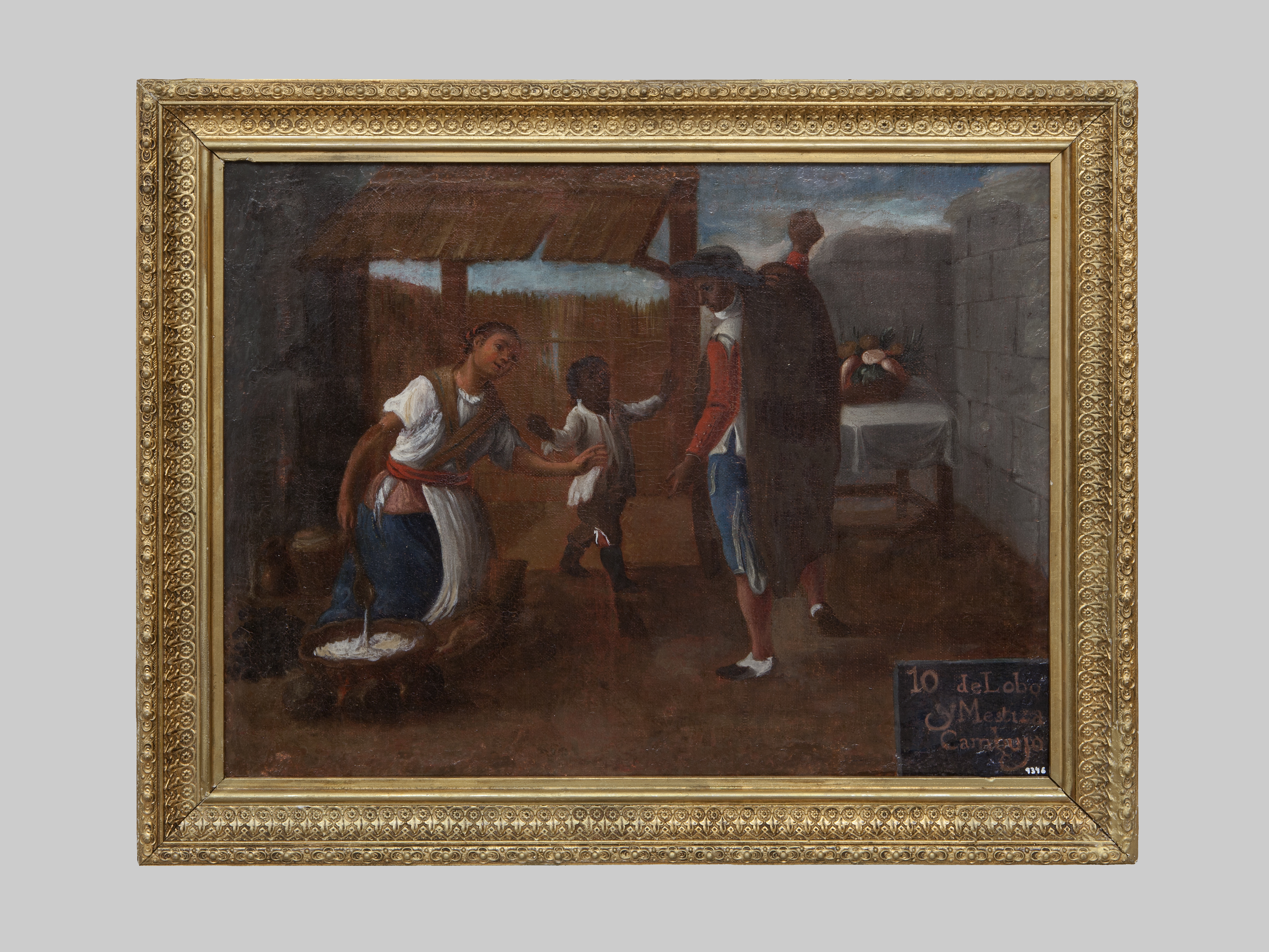
De Lobo y Mestiza, Cambujo. Anon. 18th c. Mexico

Ignacio María Barreda (1777)

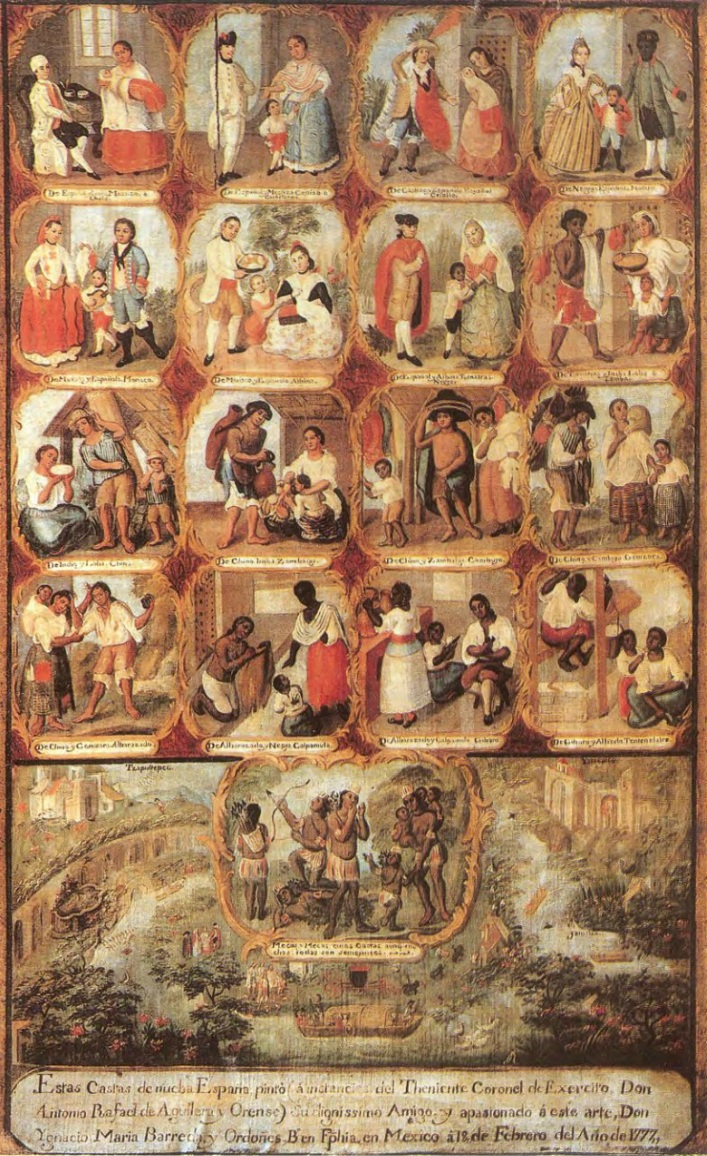

1. Español + India - Mestizo or Cholo
2. Español + Mestiza - Castizo or cuarterón
3. Castizo + Española - Español Criollo
4. Negro + Española - Mulato
5. Mulato + Española - Morisco
6. Morisco + Española - Albina
7. Español + Tornatrás Negro
8. Torna atrás + India - Lobo or Zambo
9. Indio + Loba - Chino
10. Chino + India - Zambaiga
11. Zambaiga + Chino - Cambujo
12. Cambuja + Chino - Genízara
13. Genízara + Chino - Albarazado
14. Albarazado + Negra - Calpamula
15. Calpamula + Albarazado - Gíbaro
16. Gíbaro + Albarazao - Tente en el aire
17. Mecos and Mecas, even though they are many, they are all similar

Anonymous (late 18th c?)

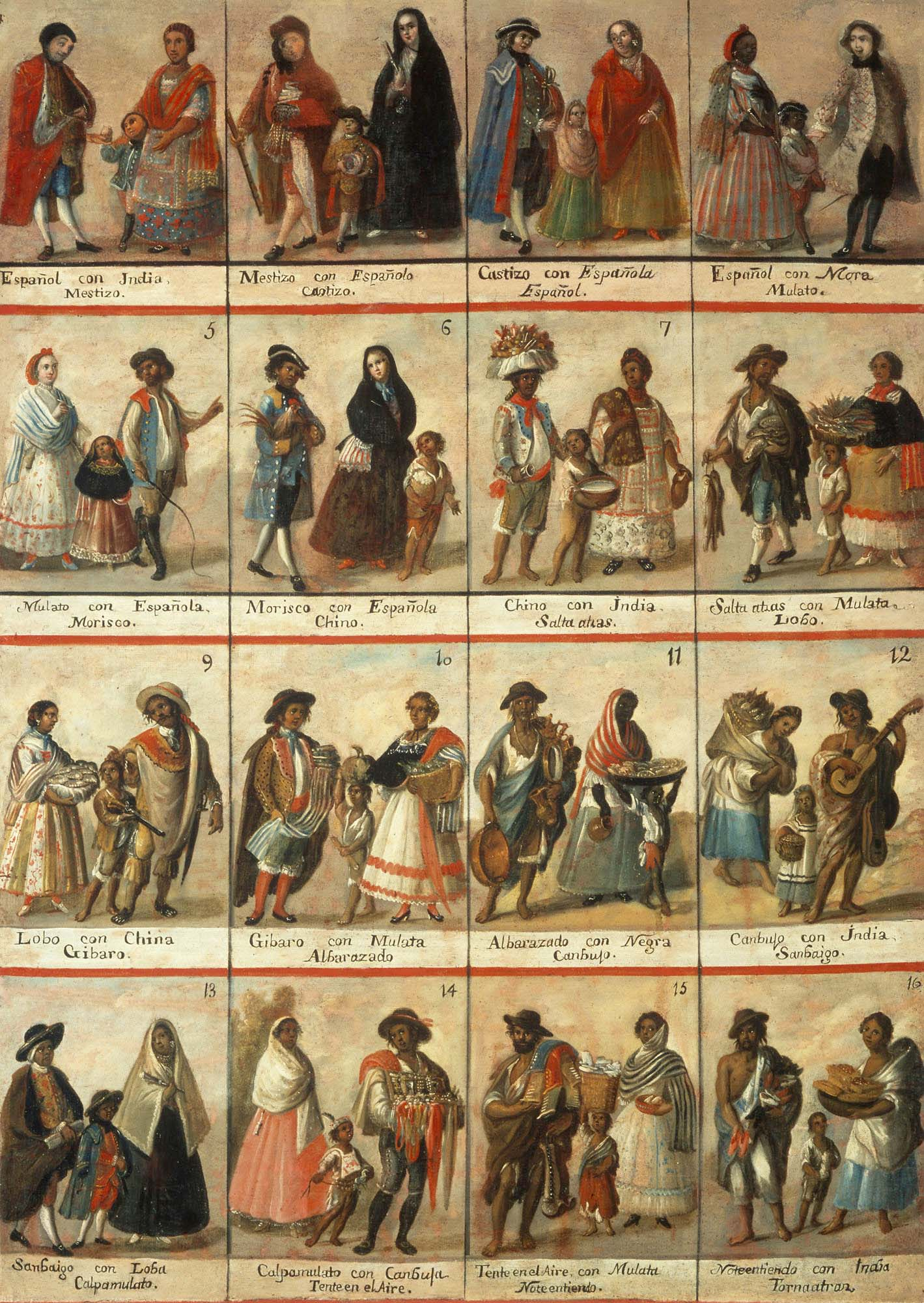

1. Español con India, Mestizo
2. Mestizo con Española, Castizo
3. Castiza con Español, Española
4. Español con Negra, Mulato
5. Mulato con Española, Morisca
6. Morisco con Española, Chino
7. Chino con India, Salta atrás
8. Salta atrás con Mulata, Lobo
9. Lobo con China, Gíbaro [Jíbaro]
10. Gíbaro con Mulata, Albarazado
11. Albarazado con Negra, Cambujo
12. Cambujo con India, Sambaiga (Zambaiga)
13. Sambaigo con Loba, Calpamulato
14. Calpamulto con Cambuja, Tente en el aire
15. Tente en el aire con Mulata, No te entiendo
16. No te entiendo con India, Torna atrás

== See also ==
- Coyote (racial category)
