= Coyote (racial category) =

Racial term

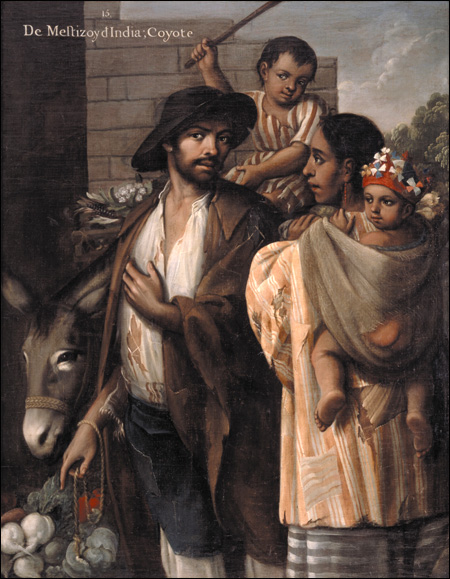
De Mestizo y de India; Coyote. Miguel Cabrera, 1763, oil on canvas, Waldo-Dentzel Art Center.

De mestizo e india, sale coiote. Anonymous, 18th century (From a Mestizo man and an Amerindian woman, a coyote is begotten).

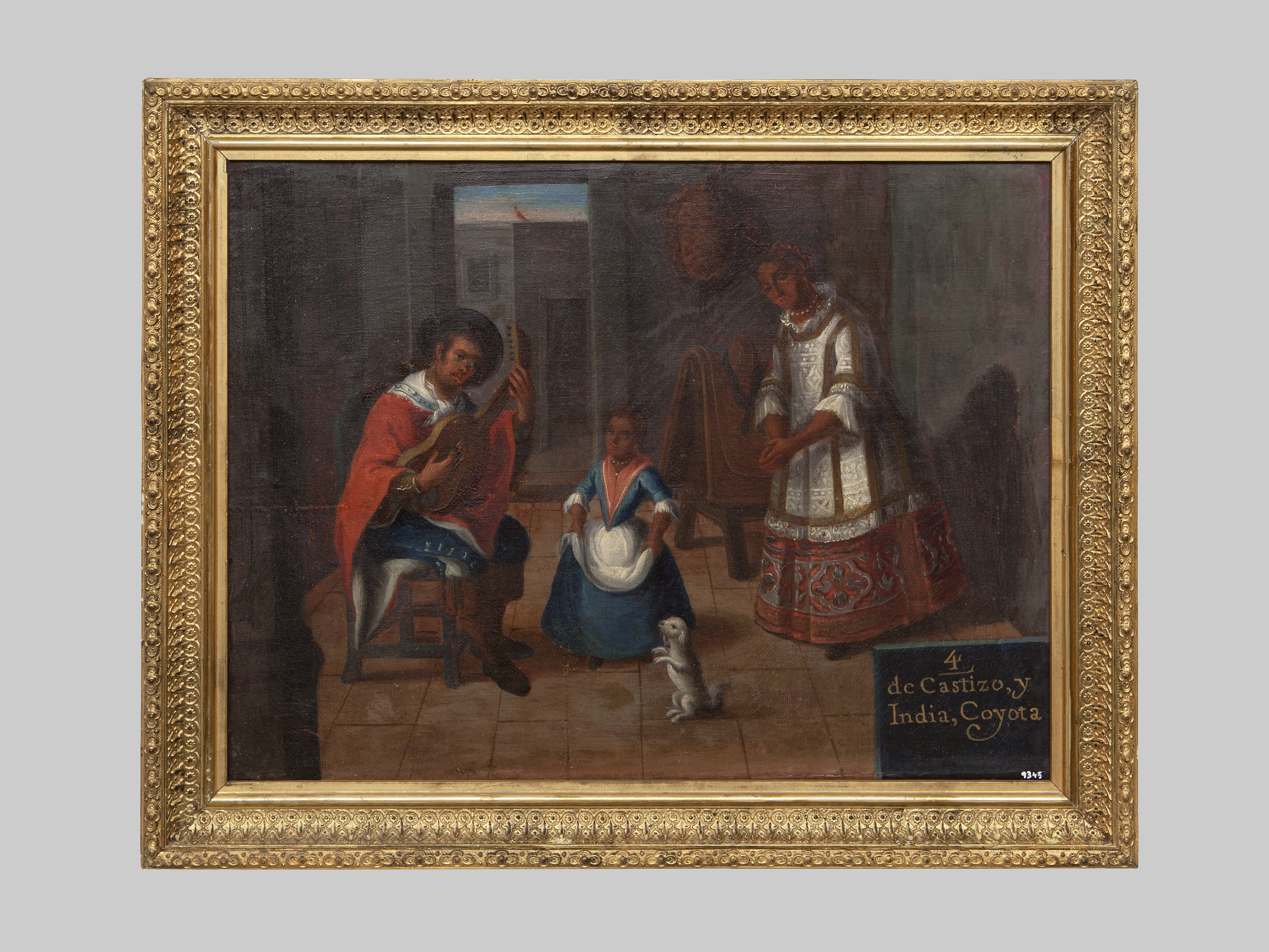
De Castizo y India, Coyota. Anonymous, 18th century Mexico.

Coyote (fem. Coyota) (from the Nahuatl word coyotl, coyote) is a colonial Spanish American racial term for a mixed-race person casta that usually refers to a person born of parents, one of whom is a Mestizo (Mixed European-Spanish and Native American) and the other Native American (Indio).

== Representation ==
The casta paintings by Miguel Cabrera (1763) show the place of the coyote in the idealized colonial racial hierarchy (sistema de castas). In colonial Mexico, the term varied regionally, with "regional differences determin[ing] just how much native ancestry qualified a person to be a coyote."

== See also ==
- Casta
- Cholo
