= Lucina Jiménez =

Mexican anthropologist, researcher and orator

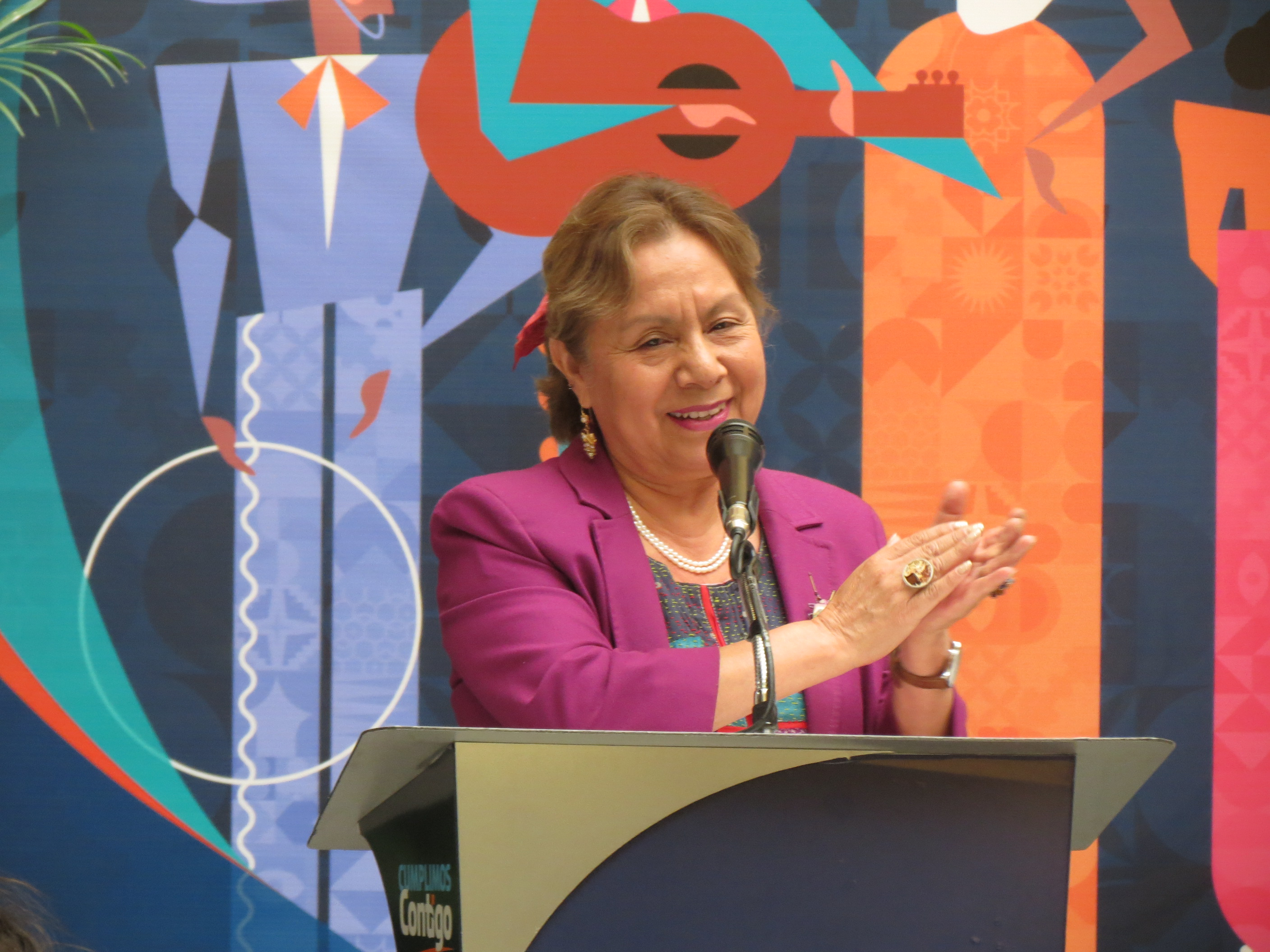

Director General of the Instituto Nacional de Bellas Artes y Literatura
- Incumbent
- Assumed office 5 December 2018
- President: Andrés Manuel López Obrador
- Preceded by: Lidia Camacho

Personal details
- Born: Lucina Jiménez López; 1959 (age 66–67) Mexico City, Mexico
- Education: National School of Anthropology and History; UAM Iztapalapa
- Occupation: Anthropologist
- Website: lucinajimenez.net

Lucina Jiménez López (born 1959) is a Mexican anthropologist. Since 2018, she has been director general of the Instituto Nacional de Bellas Artes y Literatura (INBA).

== Biography ==
Lucina Jiménez was born in Mexico City in 1959. She earned a licentiate in social anthropology from the National School of Anthropology and History, and a doctorate in anthropological sciences from UAM Iztapalapa. She specializes in cultural policies, sustainable development, arts education, cultural rights, and a culture of peace.

Since 2000, she has been a member of the UNESCO Chair in Cultural Policies and Cooperation at the University of Girona, Spain. She has served as an international consultant on cultural policies and development for the Spanish Agency for International Development Cooperation (AECID), the Organization of Ibero-American States (OEI), the Andrés Bello Agreement, UNESCO, and the Organization of American States (OAS), as well as for various projects in Colombia, Cuba, the Dominican Republic, Peru, Brazil, South Africa, Honduras, Guatemala, Mexico, Spain, and the United States.

In 2011, Jiménez was appointed UNESCO Paris Expert on Governance for Culture and Development, where she advised various governments on new governance frameworks for culture as a right and a component of sustainable human development.

In 2015, she was appointed Expert to the Culture Commission of the World Council of United Cities and Local Governments (UCLG), based in Barcelona, to advise Mexico City and Mérida on the implementation of the new Agenda 21 for culture, which focuses on cultural rights and sustainable development at the local level.

== Public and civil sector work in Mexico ==
Jiménez was deputy director of dissemination of the General Directorate of Popular Cultures, Radio Educación's deputy director of planning, technical director of the Cultural Program of the Borders, and founded the National System of Cultural Information.

She was the general director of the National Center for the Arts from May 2001 to August 2005. From there, she directed the creation of five arts centers in different Mexican states, in addition to promoting new models for reflection, practice, and development of arts education, cultural management, and online training. She served as a member of the advisory council for the design of the 2013–2018 General Development Program for Mexico City. She was coordinator of the Culture Commission's Advisory Council for the 61st and 62nd Legislatures of the Chamber of Deputies. She is an "inspirational" member of ConArte Internacional, based in Girona, Spain.

In December 2018, she was appointed director general of INBA.

== International cooperation networks ==
Jiménez has had a long career in international cooperation networks related to cultural rights and cultural policies. In 2015, she was a speaker at the UCLG World Summit in Bilbao, Spain, and at the World Summit on Art and Culture for Peace, held in Bogotá in March 2015. In 2018, she was a juror for the UCLG International Award presented in Mexico City.

== Director general of ConArte ==
From May 2006 to 2018, Jiménez was director general of the International Art and School Consortium (ConArte), an association operating in several cities in Mexico and Spain to promote arts education, cultural rights, diversity, and a culture of peace.

== Publications ==
- Teatro y públicos, el lado oscuro de la sala (2000)
- El Público (2001), coordinated with Marisa Giménez Cacho
- Democracia cultural. Una conversación (2006), with Sabina Berman
- Políticas culturales en transición; retos y escenarios de la gestión cultural en México (2006)
- Cultura y Sostenibilidad en Iberoamérica (2010), with Jesús Martín-Barbero and Renato Ortiz
- Gestión cultural y lectura en tiempos de diversidad (2012)
- Miradas al arte desde la educación (2015), anthology published by the Ministry of Public Education
- Arte para la Convivencia y Educación para la Paz (2017)
- Educación artística, cultura y ciudadanía (2021)
