= Carlos Alberto Scolari =

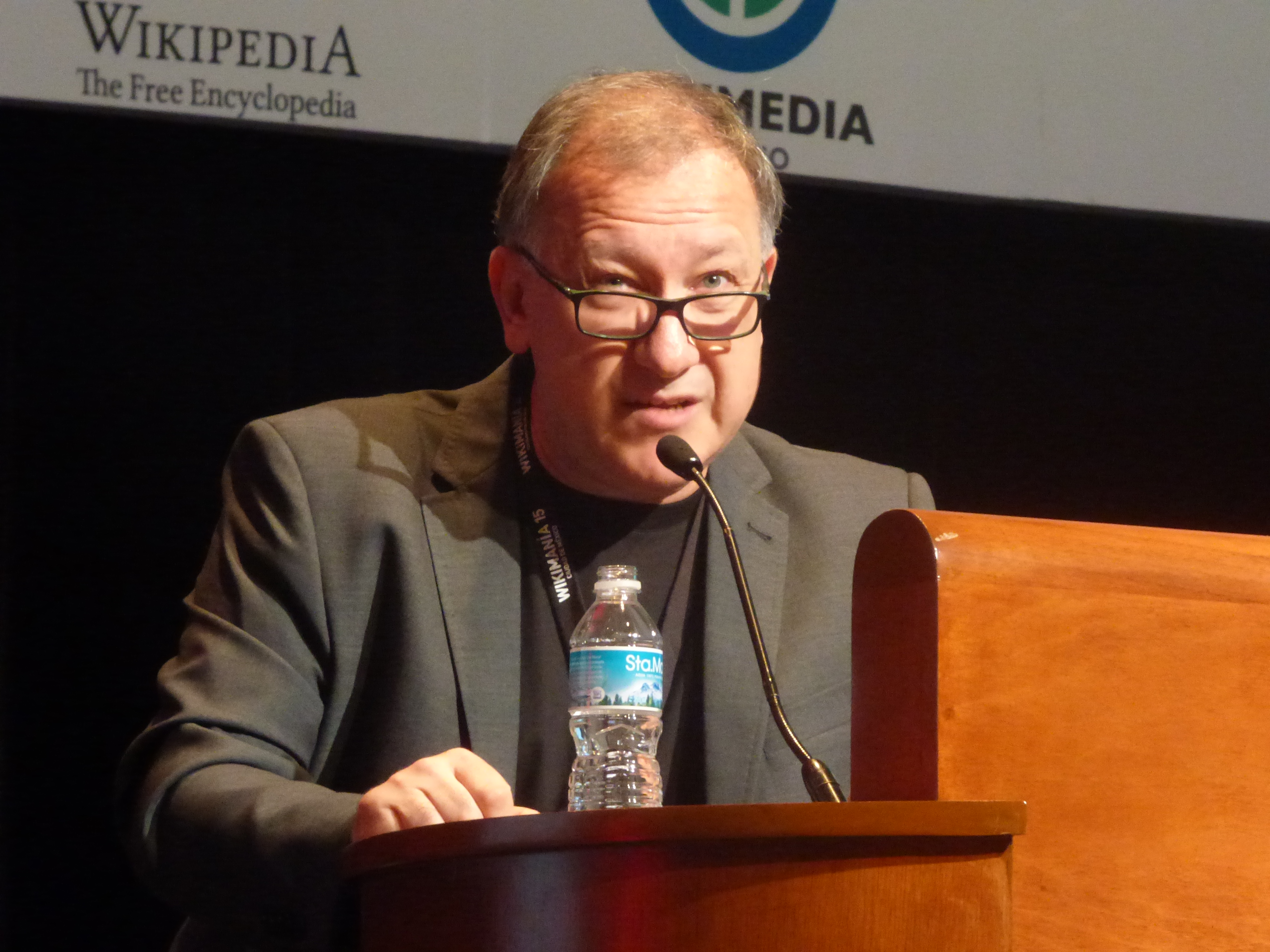
Scolari at the Wikimania 2015 conference

Carlos Alberto Scolari (born 1963 Rosario, Argentina) is a researcher and expert in communication and digital media, interfaces and communication ecology. Building on the tradition of the theories of mass media, since 1990, he has been dedicated to studying new forms of communication arising from the spread of the World Wide Web.

== Life ==
He has taught at the National University of Rosario, the University of Vic from 2002 to 2009, the Pompeu Fabra University from 2010 to 2014, and the Università Cattolica di Milano.

He has been visiting professor, lecturer and organizer of workshops at universities in Argentina, Brazil, Colombia, Mexico, United States, Canada, Portugal, Switzerland, Italy, UK, France, Belgium, Finland, Poland, Austria and Estonia.

His most outstanding scientific contributions have been in the fields of semiotics of interfaces and interaction processes, where he integrated the semiotic models of Umberto Eco and Algirdas Greimas with the cognitive theories of Donald Norman, Marvin Minsky and Francisco Varela and theories of interactive digital media, where his main references are Jesus Martin-Barbero, Alejandro Piscitelli, Marshall McLuhan, Robert K. Logan or Lev Manovich. In recent years he has taken up the study of speech television and transmedia narratives in the theoretical context of media ecology (Media Ecology).

He has lived in Europe since 1990, and currently resides in Spain.

== Bibliography ==
- Scolari, Carlos Alberto (2022). La guerra de las plataformas. Del papiro al metaverso. Barcelona: Anagrama.
- Scolari, Carlos Alberto (2021). La Gran Enciclopedia Argentina. Buenos Aires: Factotum.
- Scolari, Carlos Alberto; Fernández, José Luis & Rodríguez-Amat, Joan Ramón (2009). Mediatization(s) Theoretical conversations between Europe and Latin America. Bristol: Intellect.
- Scolari, Carlos Alberto (2021). Las leyes de la interfaz. Barcelona: Gedisa.
- Scolari, Carlos Alberto (2021). No pasarán. Las invasiones alienígenas de H.G. Wells a S. Spielberg (y más allá). Lima: Universidad de Lima.
- Scolari, Carlos Alberto (2020). Cultura Snack. Buenos Aires: La Marca.
- Scolari, Carlos Alberto, Bertetti, Paolo & Freeman, Matthew (2020). Transmedia Archaeology. Roma: Armando.
- Scolari, Carlos Alberto & Rapa, Fernando (2019). Media Evolution. Buenos Aires: La Marca.
- Chartier, Roger & Scolari, Carlos Alberto (2019). Cultura escrita y textos en red. Barcelona: Gedisa.
- Scolari, Carlos Alberto (2018). Teens, media and collaborative cultures. Exploiting teens transmedia skills in the classroom. Barcelona: H2020 Transliteracy / UPF.
- Scolari, Carlos Alberto (2018). Adolescentes, medios de comunicación y culturas colaborativas. Aprovechando las competencias transmedia de los jóvenes en el aula. Barcelona: H2020 Transliteracy / UPF.
- Scolari, Carlos Alberto (2015). Ecología de los medios: entornos, evoluciones e interpretaciones. Barcelona: Gedisa.
- Scolari, Carlos Alberto; Bertetti, Paolo & Freeman, Matthew (2014). Transmedia Archaeology. New York: Palgrave.
- Scolari, Carlos Alberto (2013). Narrativas Transmedia. Cuando todos los medios cuentan. Barcelona: Deusto.
- Scolari, Carlos Alberto (2013). Homo Videoludens 2.0: de Pacman a la gamification. Barcelona: UAB.
- Carlón, Mario & Scolari, Carlos Alberto (2009). El fin de los medios masivos. El comienzo de un debate. Buenos Aires: La Crujía.
- Ibrus, Indrek & Scolari, Carlos Alberto (2012). Crossmedia Innovation. Texts, Markets, Institutions. Frankfurt/New York: Peter Lang.
- Carlón, Mario & Scolari, Carlos Alberto (2012). Colabor_arte. Medios y artes en la era de la producción colaborativa. Buenos Aires: La Crujía.
- Piscitelli, Alejandro; Scolari, Carlos Alberto & Maguregui, Carina (2011). Lostología. Instrucciones para entrar y salir de la Isla. Buenos Aires: Cinema.
- Scolari, Carlos Alberto (2008). Hipermediaciones. Elementos para una teoría de la Comunicación Digital Interactiva. Barcelona: Gedisa. p. 317.
- Scolari, Carlos Alberto (2004). Hacer clic. Hacia una sociosemiótica de las interacciones digitales. Barcelona: Gedisa.
