= Instituto Nacional de Bellas Artes y Literatura =

Art institution in Palacio de Bellas Artes, Mexico

Coordinates: 19°26′7″N 99°8′29″W

National Institute of Fine Arts and Literature
- Instituto Nacional de Bellas Artes y Literatura
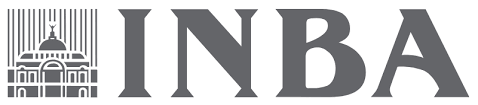

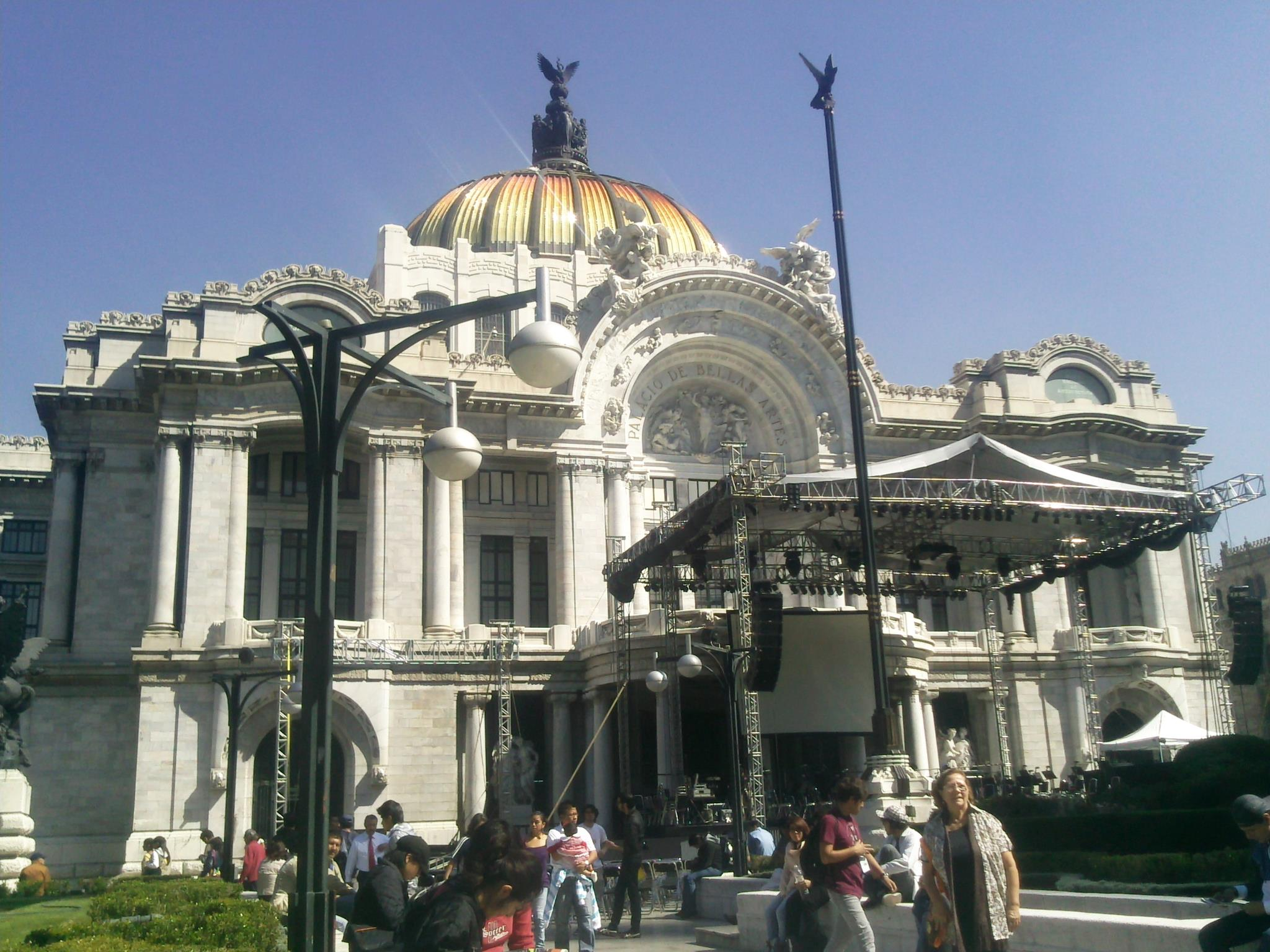
- INBAL headquarters

Agency overview
- Formed: January 1, 1947; 78 years ago
- Headquarters: Palacio de Bellas Artes, Mexico City
- Agency executive: Lucina Jiménez, Director
- Parent department: Secretariat of Culture

The Instituto Nacional de Bellas Artes y Literatura (INBAL, English: National Institute of Fine Arts and Literature), located in the Palacio de Bellas Artes in Mexico City, is the Mexican institution in charge of coordinating artistic and cultural activities (both at the political and the educational level) in the country.

On November 23, 1946, president Miguel Alemán Valdés proposed the creation of the INBA, and it was formally opened on January 1, 1947, as a branch of the Secretaría de Educación Pública (SEP). The first head of the INBA was Carlos Chávez, who created a new orchestra for the Conservatory, the current Orquesta Sinfónica Nacional.

The institute includes many departments, artistic ensembles, three national centers for storage of the literary stock, 29 schools and further institutions. The school of design and handicrafts was founded by José Chávez Morado in 1962.

One of the important services the institute provides for the nation is to protect, along with the Instituto Nacional de Antropología e Historia, monuments and buildings deemed cultural patrimony. INAH is entrusted with 'archaeological' (pre-Hispanic and paleontological) and 'historical' (post-Conquest 16th to 19th centuries) structures, zones and remnants, while INBAL is entrusted with 'artistic' buildings and monuments (properties that are of significant aesthetic value). The valuation of aesthetic value is left to the Comisión Nacional de Zonas y Monumentos Artísticos (National Commission of Artistic Zones and Monuments). This commission is composed of the Director of INBAL, a representative of the Secretaría de Desarrollo Urbano y Ecología, a representative of UNAM, and three individuals affiliated with the arts picked by the Director. Edifices deemed worthy by the commission are catalogued in the Registro Público de Monumentos y Zonas Artísticos (Public Register of Artistic Monuments and Zones).

The institute provides education from elementary school through to postgraduate level; one of the educational institutions that INBAL manages is CEDARTS (centros de educación artística or artistic education centers, in English) which is focused on artistic education.

There are 12 CEDARTS in Mexico, three in Mexico City and the rest in some other states.

1. CEDART "Alfonso Reyes" Monterrey, Nuevo León
2. CEDART "David Alfaro Siqueiros" Chihuahua, Chihuahua
3. CEDART "Diego Rivera" Ciudad de México, CDMX
4. CEDART "Emilio Abreu Gómez" Mérida, Yucatán
5. CEDART "Frida Kahlo" Ciudad de México, CDMX
6. CEDART "Ignacio Mariano de las Casas" Querétaro, Querétaro
7. CEDART "José Clemente Orozco" Guadalajara, Jalisco
8. CEDART "José Eduardo Pierson" Hermosillo, Sonora
9. CEDART "Juan Rulfo" Colima, Colima
10. CEDART "Luis Spota Saavedra" Ciudad de México, CDMX
11. CEDART "Miguel Bernal Jiménez" Morelia, Michoacán
12. CEDART "Miguel Cabrera" Oaxaca, Oaxaca

In addition to the educational offerings, there are museums, galleries and buildings under the INBAL management, that the institute often uses to present different types of artistic entertainment to the general public, such as "tempestad" or a season of flamenco dance.

== History ==
List of Directors
Directors	Period
Carlos Chávez	1946 - 1952
Andrés Iduarte	1952 - 1953
Miguel Álvarez Acosta	1954 - 1958
Celestino Gorostiza	1958 - 1964
José Luis Martínez Rodríguez	1964 - 1970
Miguel Bueno González	1970 - 1971
Luis Ortiz Macedo	1972 - 1974
Sergio Galindo	1974 - 1978
Juan José Bremer	1977 - 1982
Javier Barros Valero	1982 - 1986
Manuel de la Cera Alonso	1987 - 1988
Víctor Sandoval de León	1989 - 1991
Rafael Tovar y de Teresa	1991 - 1992
Gerardo Estrada Rodríguez	1992 - 2000
Ignacio Toscano	2001
Saúl Juárez Vega	2001 - 2006
María Teresa Franco González Salas	2006 - 2009
Teresa Vicencio Álvarez	2009 - 2012
María Cristina García Cepeda	2012 - 2017
Lidia Camacho Camacho	2017 - 2018
Lucina Jiménez	2018 -
