= Maravilla Americana =

Maravilla Americana (English: American Marvel) is a commentary written in 1756 by Miguel Cabrera on the portrait Our Lady of Guadalupe, a revered image of the Blessed Virgin Mary. The portrait is located in the Basilica of Our Lady of Guadalupe in Mexico City.

"Maravilla Americana" are the first two words of the document's title. The full title in Spanish is Maravilla americana, y conjunto de raras maravillas, observadas con la direccion de las reglas de el arte de la pintura en la prodigiosa imagen de Nuestra Sra. de Guadalupe de Mexico (1695–1768).

Cabrera received extensive praise for Maravilla Americana throughout Europe from artists and clergymen. Pope Benedict XIV described the commentary with a quote from Psalm 147:20: “Non fecit taliter omni nationi” (God’s done nothing like it for any other nation).

== History ==
In 1751, the Chapter of the Basilica asked Cabrera and six other master painters to evaluate the Guadalupan Portrait from an artistic standpoint; specifically, describing the materials and pictorial technique used by the painter. After fulfilling this request and presenting a report, Cabrera felt inspired to extend it on his own. As a professional courtesy, he required a signed opinion of his work from his six colleagues, six professional statements which were also printed in both languages.

== Chapters ==
Maravilla Americana is divided into eight chapters:

=== Chapter I ===
"On the Awesome Durability of the Image of Our Lady of Guadalupe". In Chapter 1, Cabrera discusses the durability of the portrait fibers, which had not degraded in more than 225 years. He took special note of the very thin cotton thread that united both parts of the ayate, which by itself couldn't resist the least force, remaining in place. Cabrera concluded that the fibers had lasted because the "Holy Image" of the saint was stamped on them.

=== Chapter II ===
"As to the Cloth or Canvas on Which Our Lady is Depicted". In Chapter 2, Cabrera analyzes the source of the portrait fibers. One possibility is that the fibers derive from palm trees. He dismisses the maguey plant as being too coarse for use in a portrait. Cabrera also suggests that the fiber is a middle quality European twine known as “cotense”. He concludes: “What excites admiration is the softness to the touch, it feels like silk”. But the fiber certainly doesn’t look like silk! To the sight the woof is coarse, the quality is middle.

=== Chapter III ===
"On the total absence of priming in this painting". In Chapter 3, Cabrera, said that the Guadalupan Portrait does not contain any varnish primer. This is normally required on a painting canvas; painting on a coarse fabric without varnish is impossible.

=== Chapter IV ===
"On the marvellous drawing of Our Lady of Guadalupe". In Chapter 4, Cabrera remarks on the fine quality of the Guadalupan portrait drawing: “It is unmatched; and so perfectly finished, and marvellous, that I’m fully certain that whoever with elementary knowledge of the principles of this art, on seeing it, will exceed himself in eloquence to make this portent known as miraculous”. After a long eulogy, he describes the drawing in detail.

=== Chapter V ===
"On the four different schools of painting which concur marvellously in the image of Our Lady of Guadalupe". It would be a great monstrosity to find in nature a being composed of four different animal species; no less do I consider a painting of which, in a single canvass, four different species of painting concurred in its single surface. However, this which to a human artist would be dissonant and even tasteless, we see here divinely practiced in this virginal canvass with such grace and beauty, that no matter how much I wished to exaggerate, I could never say as much as it by itself conveys to the onlooker’s eyes. More than human was the hand…etc. The four species or ways of painting are: in oil, in tempera, in gouache and in fresco…And after explaining each with its difficulty, and total lack of precedent for a single surface to the point that before Guadalupe no one could have imagined it, he says: “to me, its so efficacious, that it persuades me of its miraculous character.”

=== Chapter VI ===
"On the precious gold and exquisite gilding of the miraculous image of Our Lady of Guadalupe". In Chapter 6, Cabrera discuss the strange color of the portrait gilding. He is very impressed that the gold seems to be fused into the fibers themselves: “...because I noticed that all that’s gilded is so united to the canvass, that to the touch it can be only be felt by the concavity as if it were printed; a matter for weighty consideration, as there’s no material in the canvas of the type used for gilding... The Holy Image has its tunic gilded with some flowers of strange design. They are composed of a golden vein with the peculiarity that they follow not the pleats and undulations, but are continuous as if on a flat surface…”

=== Chapter VII ===
"Considerations on the objections against the esthetical perfection of the Image". In Chapter 7, Cabrera refutes Art criticism that claims the portrait violates what are called the "rules of painting": “The most thorough and efficacious answer to all objections presented or possible is the image itself, as I know that when attentively observed, the sharpest eyes will find no less than the complete achievement of the most perfect whole that painting ever admired.”

=== Chapter VIII ===
"On the design of the miraculous image of Our Lady of Guadalupe."

In this concluding chapter, Cabrera focuses on the artistic composition and design of the image of the Virgin of Guadalupe. He argues that the image demonstrates perfect symmetry, balance, and adherence to classical artistic principles, even surpassing the established rules of painting. According to Cabrera, these qualities are so extraordinary that they could not have been achieved by any human artist.

He concludes that the perfection of the image is proof of its divine and miraculous origin, affirming that the image was not painted by human hands but created through a supernatural act.
