= María Luisa Ross Landa =

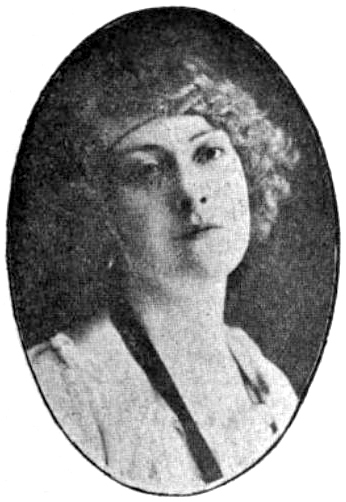
- Born: August 14, 1887; Pachuca, Mexico
- Died: June 12, 1945 (aged 57); Mexico City, Mexico
- Education: National University of Mexico; Conservatorio Nacional de Música
- Occupations: Writer, educator, actress, civil servant

María Luisa Ross Landa (Note: In this Mexican name, the surname is Ross and the second or maternal family name is Landa.) (August 14, 1887 – June 12, 1945) was a Mexican feminist writer, journalist, educator, actress, and civil servant. She was a pioneer of cultural radio in Mexico, and the first director of Radio Educación.

== Early life ==
María Luisa Ross Landa was born in Pachuca, Hidalgo, on August 14, 1887, (Note: Some sources give her birthplace as Tulancingo. It is listed as Pachuca in documents she signed as a federal employee, as well as on her death certificate. Some sources also give her birth year as 1891.) the daughter of Alejandro Ross, a Scottish military doctor, and Elena Landa, a school prefect of Spanish descent. Her father was deputy director of the recently founded General Hospital of Mexico, director of the General Hospital of Pachuca, and had ties to the government of Porfirio Díaz. Her mother was prefect at the National Secondary School for Girls in Pachuca. The family's social position afforded María Luisa access to an excellent private education, something which was available to few women at the time. Her teachers inspired her to find an academic vocation.

== Education and writing career ==
Ross Landa graduated from the Escuela Normal Superior in 1900. She studied letters and taught at the National University of Mexico's School of Higher Studies – later the School of Philosophy and Letters of the National Autonomous University of Mexico (UNAM). She next studied at the Conservatorio Nacional de Música, where she obtained a master's degree in recitation and declamation. She also attended sessions of the Mexican Youth Athenaeum. She was recognized for her erudition and for her command of languages including English, French, Portuguese, and Italian.

Some sources state that Luis G. Urbina wrote the poem Metamorfosis for her, and that Justo Sierra acted as her mentor after being impressed by one of her lectures.

She wrote for the Mexican newspapers El Universal, El Universal Ilustrado, and El Imparcial, and was the founder of Excélsior's magazine Revista de Revistas. She also contributed to the U.S. papers La Prensa and El Regidor in San Antonio, and Hispano-América in San Francisco. As a journalist, she used pseudonyms such as El Paje Merelí, Silvia Setala, and María Luisa.

Ross Landa wrote screenplays for the 1917 films Obsesión – in which she acted – and Triste crepúsculo. The same year, her poem Rosas de amor was staged at the Arbeu Theater. In 1918, she wrote the screenplay for Maciste turista, a film in which she also appeared. Thanks to her prestige in the 1920s and 1930s, she was ambassador of art and culture for UNAM in Europe. As a defender of women's rights, she advocated for greater participation of women in educational and cultural spaces. She also cofounded the Ibero-American Feminist Union, with the intention of promoting understanding among women from different countries.

== Public service ==
In 1920, Ross Landa was appointed by Victoriano Huerta as ambassador of Mexican culture in Spain. In this role, she held conferences on authors and cultural topics. She was entrusted by José Vasconcelos to create and direct prominent educational-literacy projects, including Radio Educación, the country's first educational radio station. From 1924 to 1933, she was appointed head of the radio-telephone section of the Secretariat of Public Education (SEP), in charge of the station and its content. It had the task of disseminating educational, cultural, and scientific knowledge, while the Mexican government provided receiving devices to communities. Ross Landa would visit towns and communities, where she would give lectures on the value of education. She resigned from the position after the departure of Emilio Portes Gil from SEP, and returned to direct the station from 1931 to 1933.

Several of the works written by Ross Landa for basic instruction were used in primary schools for several decades, including the award-winning Cuentos sentimentale and El mundo de los niños. She was president of the Society of Mexican Didactic Authors, and was a member of the permanent commission of the National Congress of Educators.

At a philanthropic level, she participated in the foundation of the Mexican Red Cross, and went to Monterrey to help people affected by the flood of 1909. From 1933 to 1945, she directed various libraries.

== Death and legacy ==
María Luisa Ross Landa is considered a prominent figure in cultural fields such as journalism, education, and literature. She died in Mexico City on June 12, 1945, from a duodenal ulcer and anemia.

In December 2014, the government of Hidalgo dedicated a cenotaph to her at the Rotonda de los Hidalguenses Ilustres in Pachuca.

== Works ==
=== Educational materials ===
- Cuentos sentimentales [Sentimental Stories]. Tip. y Rayados El Arte. 1916. OCLC 689517420.
- Lecturas selectas (1922)
- Memorias de una niña (1923, 1924)
- El mundo de los niños (1924)
- Lecturas instructivas y recreativas (1925)
- Historia de una Mujer

=== Novels ===
- La culpa (1920)
- Así conquista España (1923)

=== Poetry ===
- Rosas de amor (1917)
- Pérez, Alfonso M.; Ross Landa, María Luisa (1930). Mis jardines: versos [My Gardens: Poems]. Imprenta Brasil. OCLC 689517841.

=== Screenplays ===
- Obsesión (1917)
- Triste crepúsculo (1917)
- Maciste turista (1918)
