= Lidia Camacho =

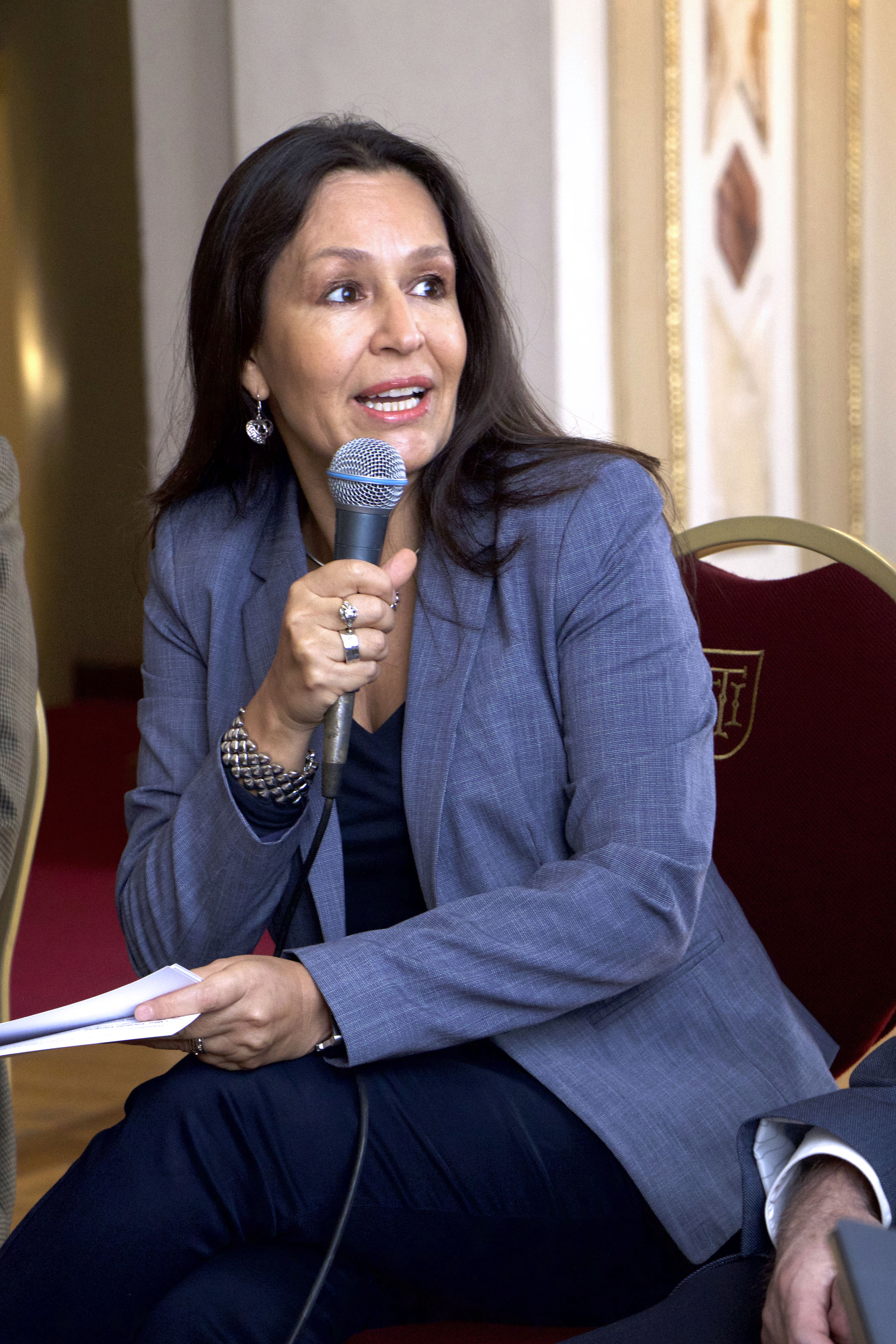
- Born: Lidia Camacho Camacho; Mexico City, Mexico
- Education: National Autonomous University of Mexico
- Occupations: Academic, public official
- Political party: Institutional Revolutionary Party
- Awards: José Pagés Llergo Award (1999); Ordre des Arts et des Lettres (2004)

Lidia Camacho Camacho is a Mexican communication scientist, teacher, essayist, and public official. Her research has focused on the discipline of sound art.

In her work in the public sector, she has been the director of the cultural station Radio Educación (2000–2007) and the Festival Internacional Cervantino. She was a founder of the Fonoteca Nacional, and served as its director for two terms (2007–2009, 2013–2017). She was general director of the Instituto Nacional de Bellas Artes y Literatura (INBA) from January 2017 to December 2018. Since January 2019, she has been the general director of Televisión Educativa.

== Biography ==
Lidia Camacho studied communication sciences at Anahuac University, earned a master's degree in art history at the School of Philosophy and Letters of the National Autonomous University of Mexico (UNAM), and a PhD at its School of Political and Social Sciences. She collaborated with television producer Valentín Pimstein and was assistant director under Rafael Banquells at Televisa. In 1984 she joined Radio Educación as a writer, producer, and broadcaster, becoming its director from 2000 to 2007. In her management of the public station, she promoted the creation of the Artistic Experimentation Laboratory, for productions and research on sound, experimental, and improvisational art.

She was vice president of the International Sound and Audiovisual Archives Association from 2008 to 2009 and became a member of the UNESCO Memory of the World Programme committee. She also participated in the creation of the International Radio Biennale, and served as its director. She promoted the creation of the Mexican Standard for the Cataloging of Phonographic Documents, and was director of the Association of Public Broadcasters and Televisors of Mexico.

From 2009 to 2012 Camacho directed the Festival Internacional Cervantino. She participated in the planning and creation of the Fonoteca Nacional from 2007 to 2009, acting as its director in those years, as well as for a second term from 2013 to 2017.

She became general director of INBA in January 2017.

== Chapter 3000 dispute ==
During Camacho's administration, employees hired under the auspices of Chapter 3000 (Spanish: Capítulo 3000), the labor hiring regimen established in the Acquisitions, Leases, and Public Sector Services Law, reported regular arrears in their payments, as well as precarious working conditions. In March 2018 the dispute gained public attention through social networks – with the hashtag #YaPágameINBA (Pay Me Already, INBA) – because the staff hired for fees had not received the payments corresponding to January and February of that year, and because this was a recurrent practice of the institute. On Monday, 26 March 2018, the INBA workers hired through Chapter 3000 held a work stoppage at several museums. The protest went viral and attracted the attention of various media outlets after the publication of a tweet from the official account of the Museo Nacional de Arte (MUNAL) denouncing the lack of payment. Later that day, a group of around 70 people demonstrated peacefully outside the Palacio de Bellas Artes, with placards demanding the improvement of their working conditions.

Given the media and social pressure, INBA authorities agreed to meet with Chapter 3000 workers. In this meeting, INBA agreed to settle the debts and establish a punctual payment schedule – a promise which they failed to uphold in May. They also declared themselves incapable of resolving the labor crisis, arguing that the hiring schemes are established by the Secretariat of Finance and Public Credit. They also stated that INBA is governed by the Acquisitions, Leases, and Public Sector Services Law and not the Federal Labor Law.

In December 2018, President López Obrador named anthropologist Lucina Jiménez to replace Camacho as INBA director, and on 23 January 2019, he appointed her general director of Televisión Educativa.

== Senate candidacy ==
In March 2018, Lidia Camacho was part of a multi-member candidacy for the Senate of the Republic by the Institutional Revolutionary Party (PRI) as a substitute for Vanessa Rubio, the office coordinator of presidential candidate José Antonio Meade. However, she decided to withdraw from the candidacy three months later.

== Awards and recognitions ==
- José Pagés Llergo National Journalism Award, 1999
- Chevalier of the Ordre des Arts et des Lettres, 2004
- Anahuac Medal of Leadership in Communication, 2008
- Jade Award for Culture from the Government of Taiwan, 2011

== Works ==
- Tercera Bienal Latinoamericana de Radio: México 2000 (2000), Secretariat of Culture
- Agustín Yáñez y Radio Educación: Dos destinos paralelos (2004)
- Los medios públicos de cara a la democracia memorias (2005), La Red de Radiodifusores y Televisoras Educativas y Culturales
- El patrimonio sonoro: una huella que se borra (2005), Radio Educación
- Una década de irradiar nuevas ideas sonoras. La historia de la Bienal Internacional de Radio. (2006), Radio Educación
- Caminos del arte sonoro (2006), Radio Educación
- El radioarte: un género sin fronteras (Trillas, 2007), ISBN 9789682479441
