= Miguel Cabrera (painter) =

Mexican painter (1695–1768)

- Born: Miguel Mateo Maldonado y Cabrera; 1710; Nueva Antequera, New Spain
- Died: May 16, 1768 (aged 57–58); Mexico City
- Movement: Baroque

Miguel Mateo Maldonado y Cabrera (1710 – May 16, 1768) was a Mexican painter of the late Baroque in New Spain. During his lifetime, he was recognized as the greatest painter in the viceroyalty. He created religious and secular art for the Catholic Church and wealthy patrons. His casta paintings, depicting interracial marriage among Amerindians, Spaniards and Africans, are considered among the genre's finest. Cabrera's paintings range from tiny works on copper to enormous canvases and wall paintings. He also designed altarpieces and funerary monuments.

== Biography ==
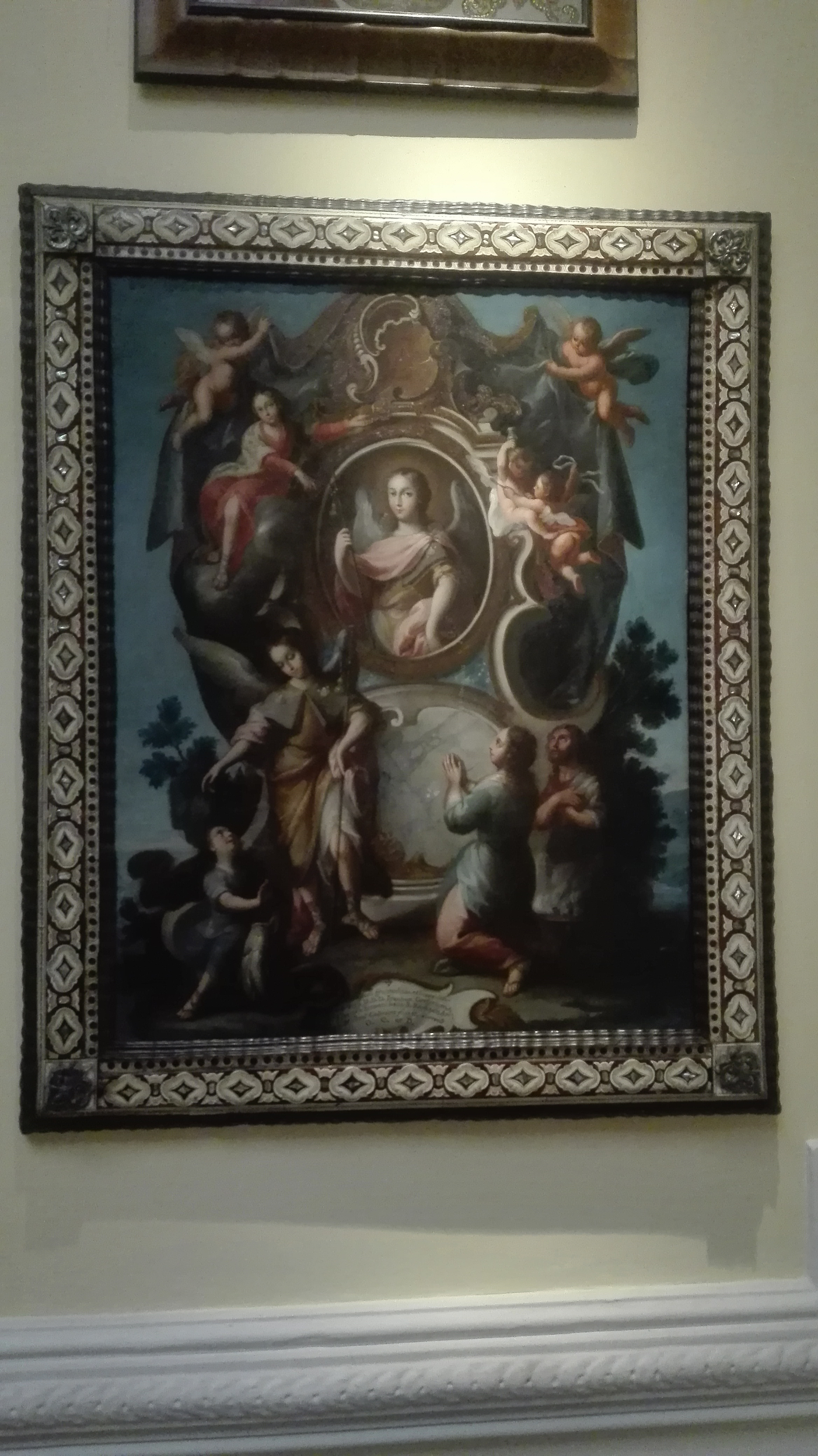
Miguel Cabrera, El arcángel san Rafael (c. 1745–1768), the lobby of the House Museum Guillermo Tovar de Teresa at the Museo Soumaya

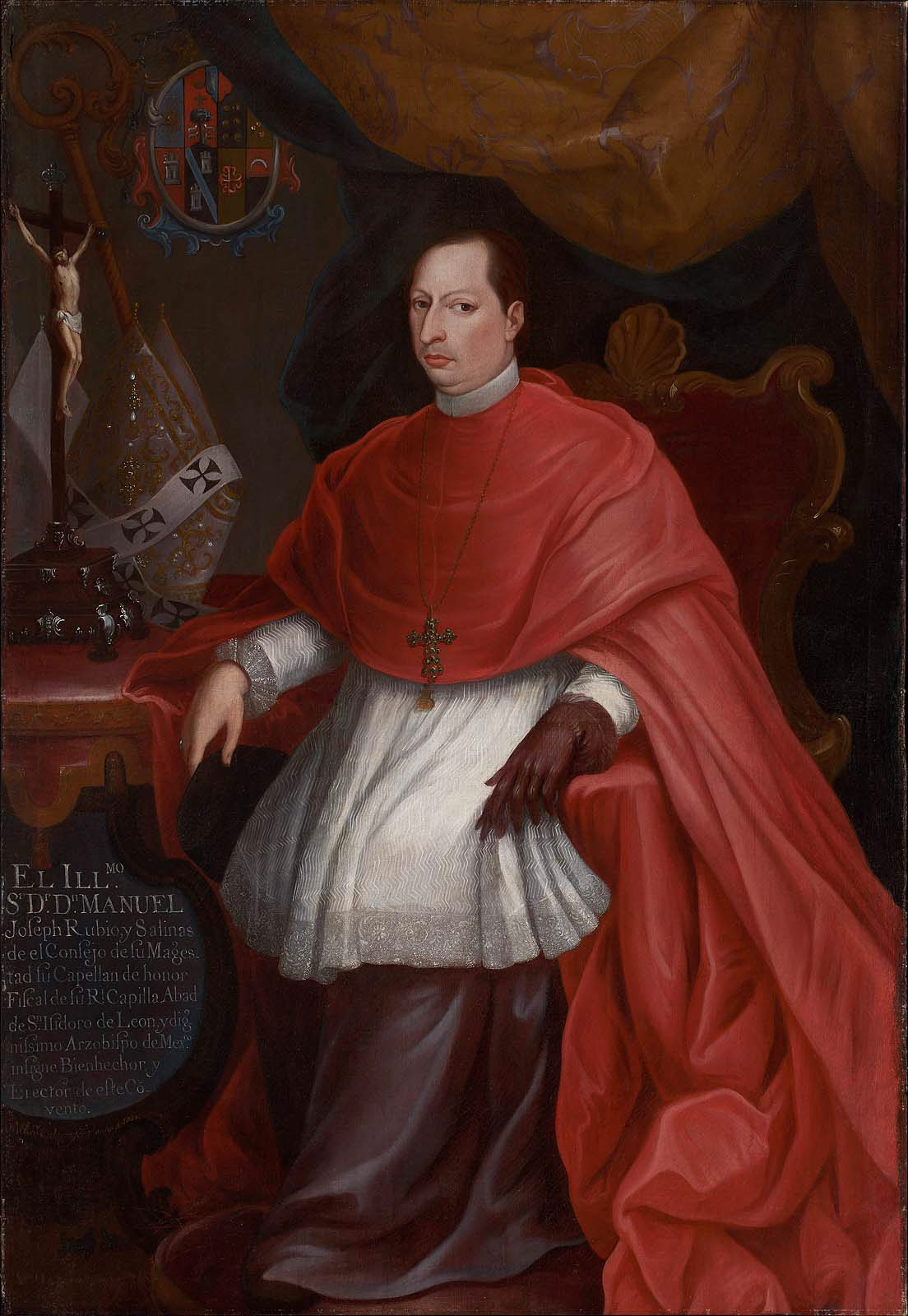
Portrait of Cabrera's patron, Archbishop Manuel José Rubio y Salinas, 1751. Museum of Fine Arts, Boston

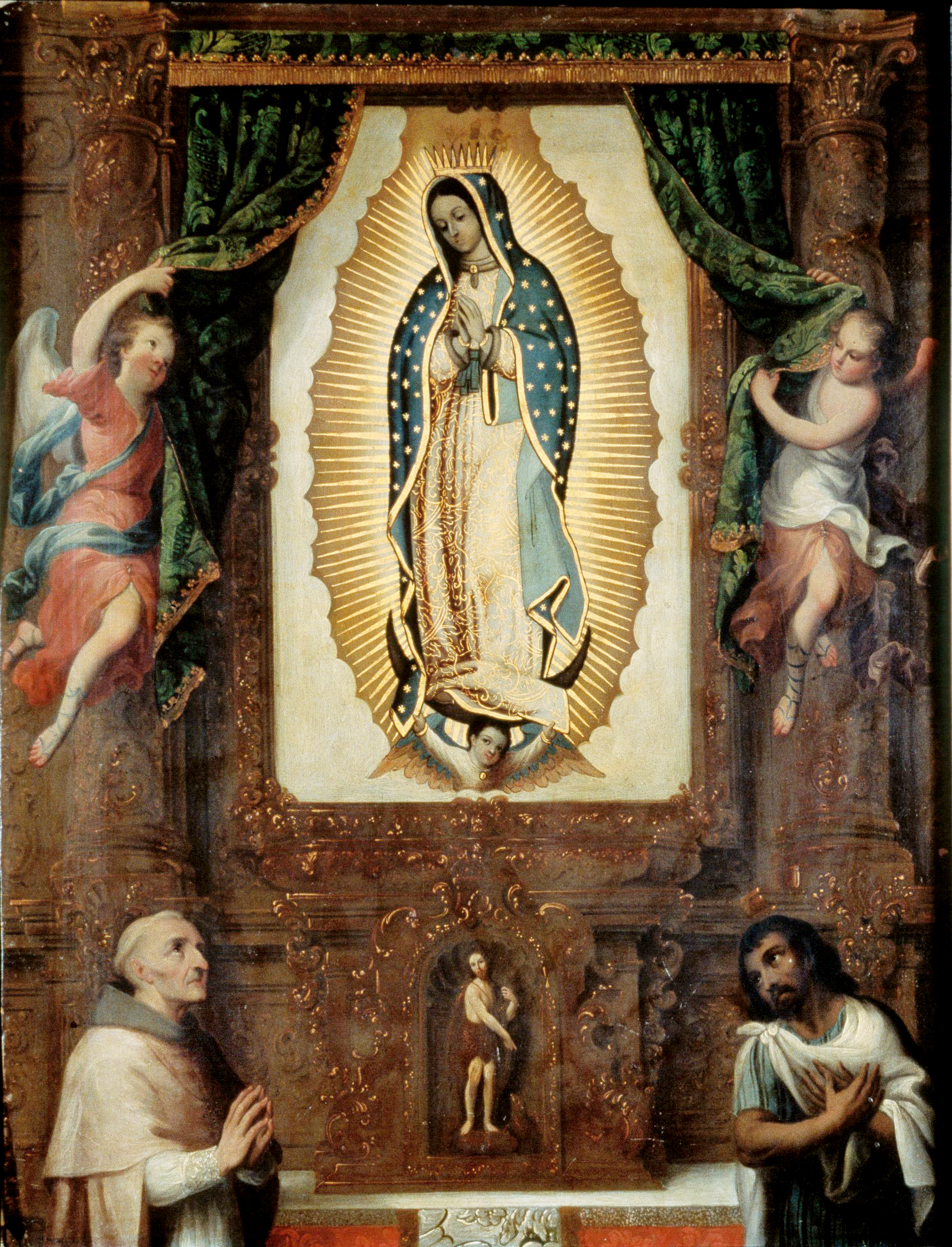
Altarpiece of the Virgin of Guadalupe with St. John the Baptist, Fray Juan de Zumárraga and Juan Diego

Miguel Mateo Maldonado y Cabrera (as he is referred to in his 1739 marriage banns and named in his 1760 will) stated in both of his testamentary documents (1760 and 1768) that he was a native of the city of Antequera (present-day Oaxaca de Juárez)— an episcopal seat and the most important city in the diocese of Oaxaca.

It has not yet been possible to identify his baptismal record with absolute certainty. For a long time—despite doubts raised by historians such as Abelardo Carrillo y Gariel and Guillermo Tovar de Teresa— it was assumed that his baptism corresponded to that of a Miguel born in Antequera on February 27, 1695, to unknown parents, with Gregorio de Cabrera and Juana de Reyna serving as godparents.

However, in 1760, in the request submitted to the Royal and Pontifical University of Mexico by Agustín Rodríguez Medrano to obtain a bachelor’s degree, Cabrera himself —acting as a witness— stated that he was 50 years old. This would point to 1710 as his actual year of birth. In the same document, Cabrera claims that, as a "young child," he frequented the workshop of the painter Francisco Xavier Vázquez Loya (1670–1733) in Mexico City. This suggests the possibility that, despite being born in Antequera, he may have lived in the capital of the Viceroyalty of New Spain from early childhood, receiving his entire artistic training there— either under the aforementioned Vázquez or another master, such as the Rodríguez Juárez brothers, or José de Ibarra. Cabrera was a favorite painter of Archbishop Manuel José Rubio y Salinas, whose portrait he twice painted, and of the Jesuits, which earned him many commissions.

In 1756 he created an important analytical study of the icon of the Virgin of Guadalupe, Maravilla americana y conjunto de raras maravillas observadas con la dirección de las reglas del arte de la pintura ("American marvel and ensemble of rare wonders observed with the direction of the rules of the art of painting", often referred to in English simply as American Marvel). Cabrera and a group of six other painters analyzed the painting, with scientific eyes, not religious, identifying four different substances used in the painting: "oil, tempera with agglutinates, an aguazo, and a fresco-like tempera". In Cabrera's assessment, no painter was capable of using such techniques in the eighteenth century, much less in the sixteenth century, when the image was created. Cabrera was concerned that there was a proliferation of inferior copies of the painting, and let it be known that the noted seventeenth-century painter, Juan Correa, used a waxed paper template of the image, so that down to the last detail, copies were faithful to the original. Cabrera's atelier created many copies of the image, some of which were signed by Cabrera himself. He sought faithfulness to the original image but to add luster and power to the copies, some paintings had the notation "touched to the original", [Tocada a su Original] with the date. In 1752 he was again permitted access to the icon of Our Lady of Guadalupe to make three copies with the aid of fellow painters, José de Alcíbar and José Bentura Arnáez. The copies were for his patron Archbishop José Manuel Rubio y Salinas, one for Pope Benedict XIV, and a third to use "as a model for further copies".

The essential purpose of Maravilla Americana was to affirm the 1666 opinions of the witnesses who swore that the image of the Virgin was of a miraculous nature. However, he also elaborated a novel opinion: the image was crafted with a unique variety of techniques. He contended that the Virgin's face and hands were painted in oil paint, while her tunic, mandorla, and the cherub at her feet were all painted in egg tempera. Finally, her mantle was executed in gouache. He observed that the golden rays emanating from the Virgin seemed to be of dust that was woven into the very fabric of the canvas, which he asserted was of "a coarse weave of certain threads which we vulgarly call pita," a cloth woven from palm fibers.

His involvement in the analysis of the Guadalupe image was part of his long term campaign to raise the status of painters from mere artisans to respected practitioners of the liberal arts. It came at the same time that Mexican archbishop Manuel José Rubio y Salinas (1749-1765) sought the designation of the Virgin of Guadalupe as a universal patron. Jesuit Francisco López was the advocate in Rome for her cause. Benedict XIV recognized Guadalupe with her own feast day, starting in 1754.

In 1753, he founded the second Academy of Painting in Mexico City and served as its director.

Most of the rest of his works are also religious in nature; as the official painter of the Archbishop of Mexico, Cabrera painted his and other portraits. In 1760, Cabrera created The Virgin of the Apocalypse, which describes the chapter 12 of the Book of Revelation. He is also known for his posthumous portrait of the seventeenth-century poet Sor Juana Inés de la Cruz.

Cabrera is currently most famous for his casta paintings. One of the sixteen in the set that was missing for many years was purchased by the Los Angeles County Museum of Art in 2015. The museum received information that the last of the sixteen, thought lost, may be in Los Angeles, California.

In the 19th century, the writer José Bernardo Couto called him "the personification of the great artist and of the painter par excellence; and a century after his death the supremacy which he knew how to merit remains intact." His remains are interred at the Church of Santa Inés in Mexico City.

== Gallery ==
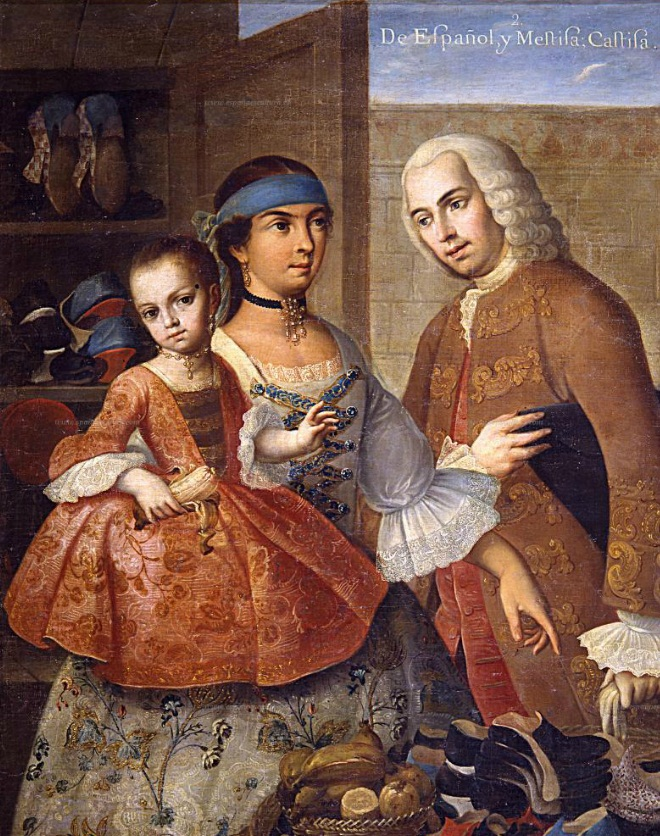
A casta painting, here he shows a Español (Spanish) father, Mestiza (mixed Native American-Spanish) mother, and their Castiza daughter

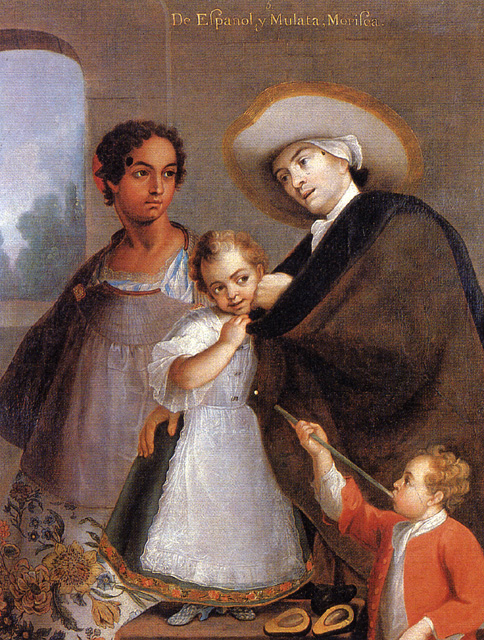
Pintura de Castas, "From Spaniard and Mulatta, Morisca", oil on canvas, private collection

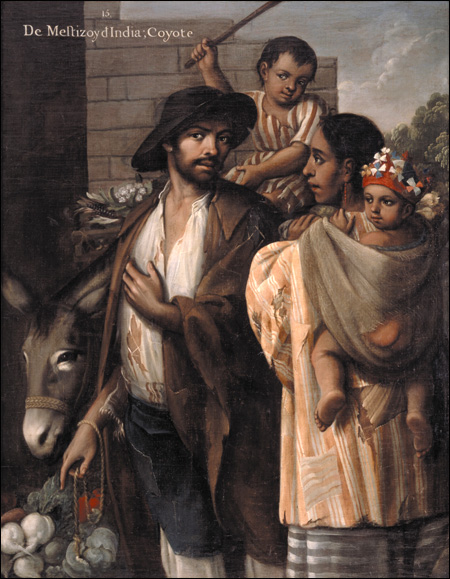
A casta painting, De Mestizo y d'India; Coyote, 1763, oil on canvas, Waldo-Dentzel Art Center

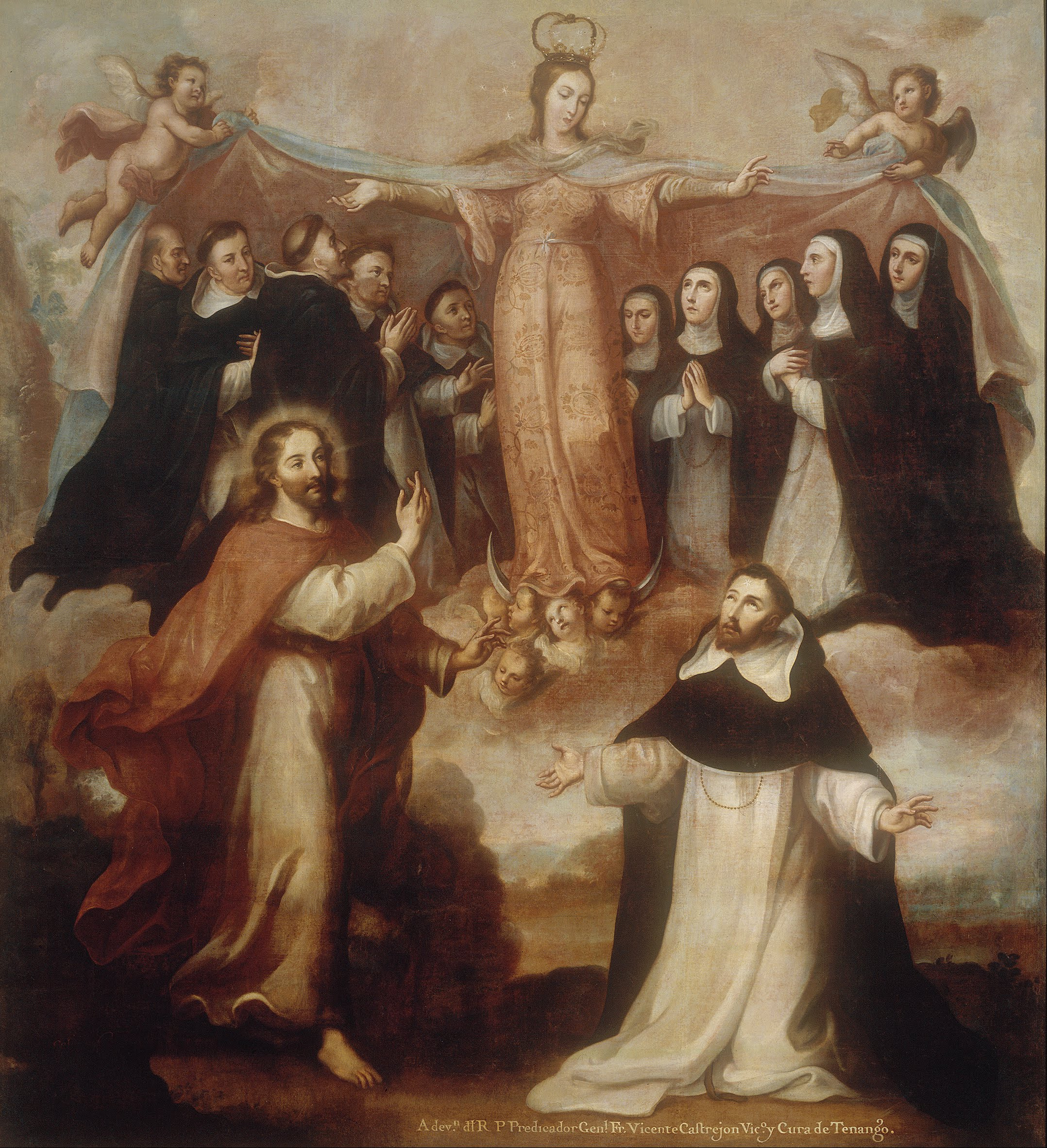
Allegory of the Virgin Patroness of the Dominicans

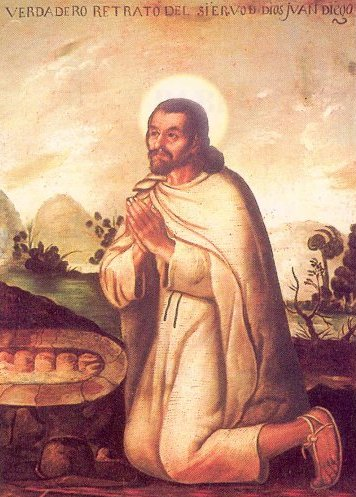
Juan Diego

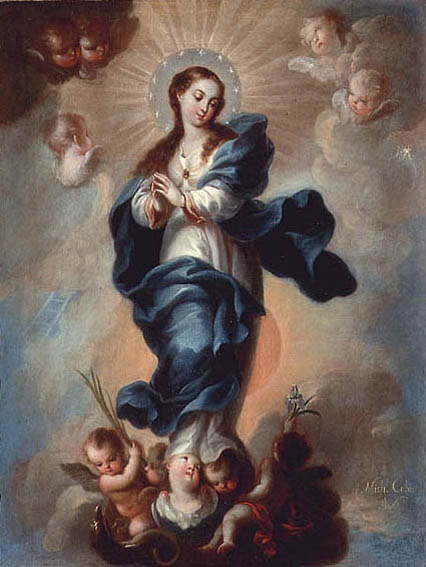
Virgin of the Apocalypse

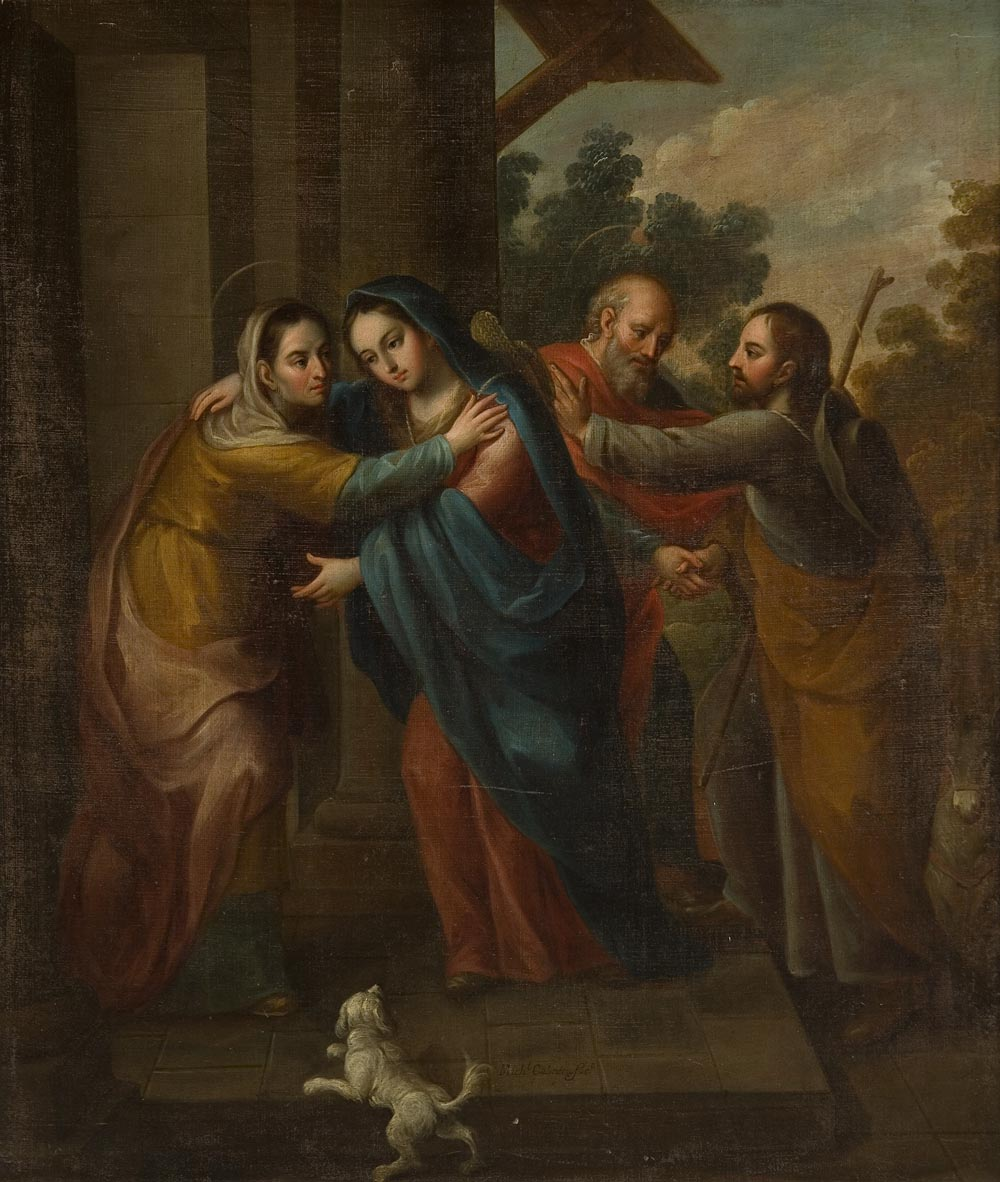
The Visitation

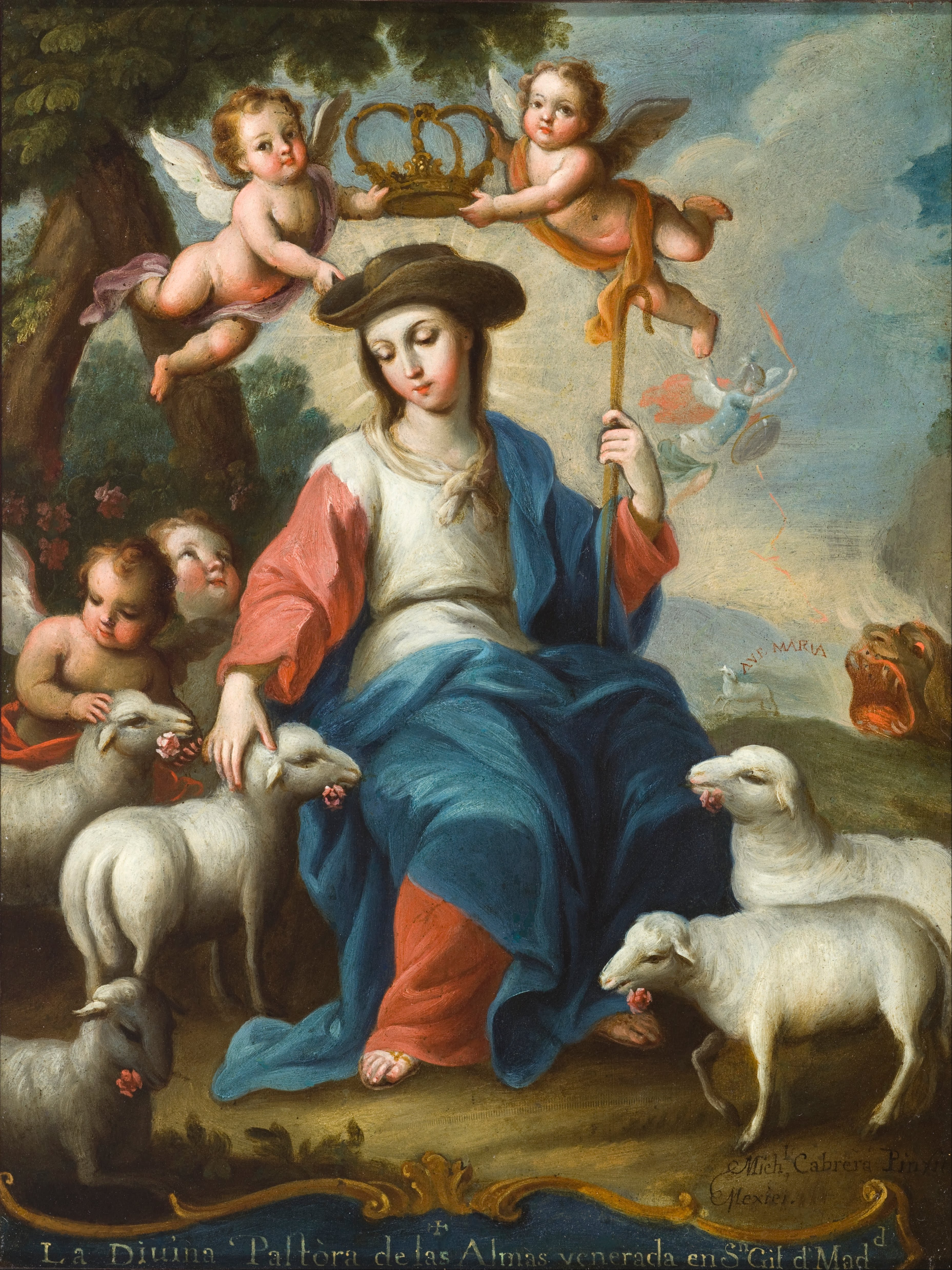
The Divine Shepherdess, around 1760

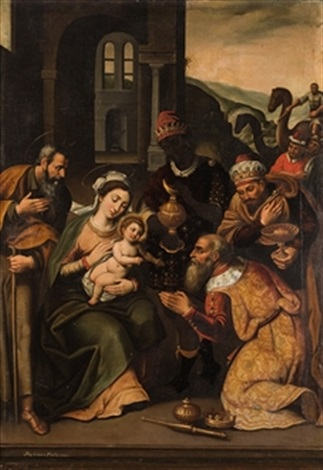
The Adoration of the Kings

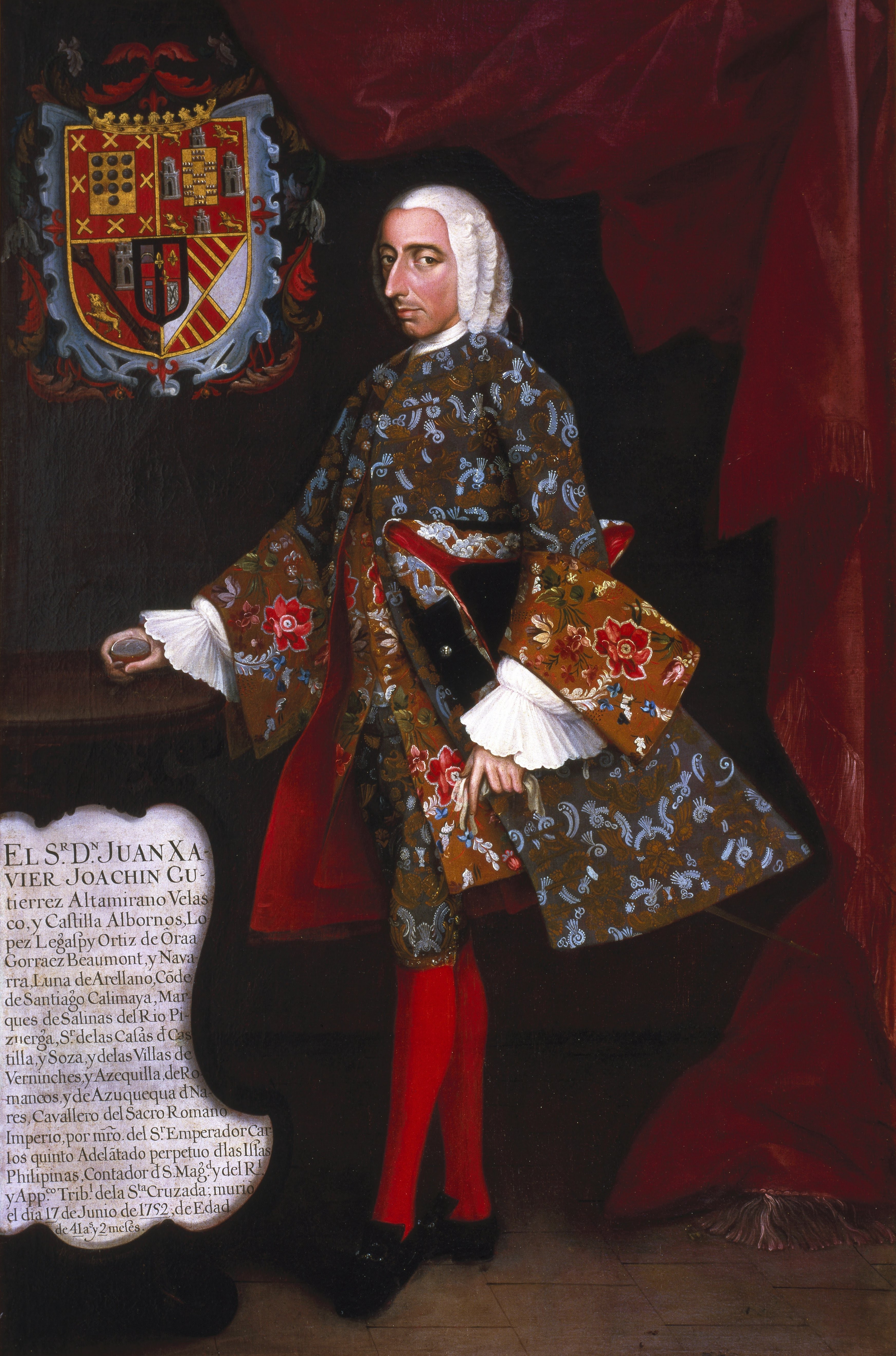
Don Juan Xavier Joachín Gutiérrez Altamirano Velasco, Count of Santiago de Calimaya, c. 1752. Oil on canvas Brooklyn Museum

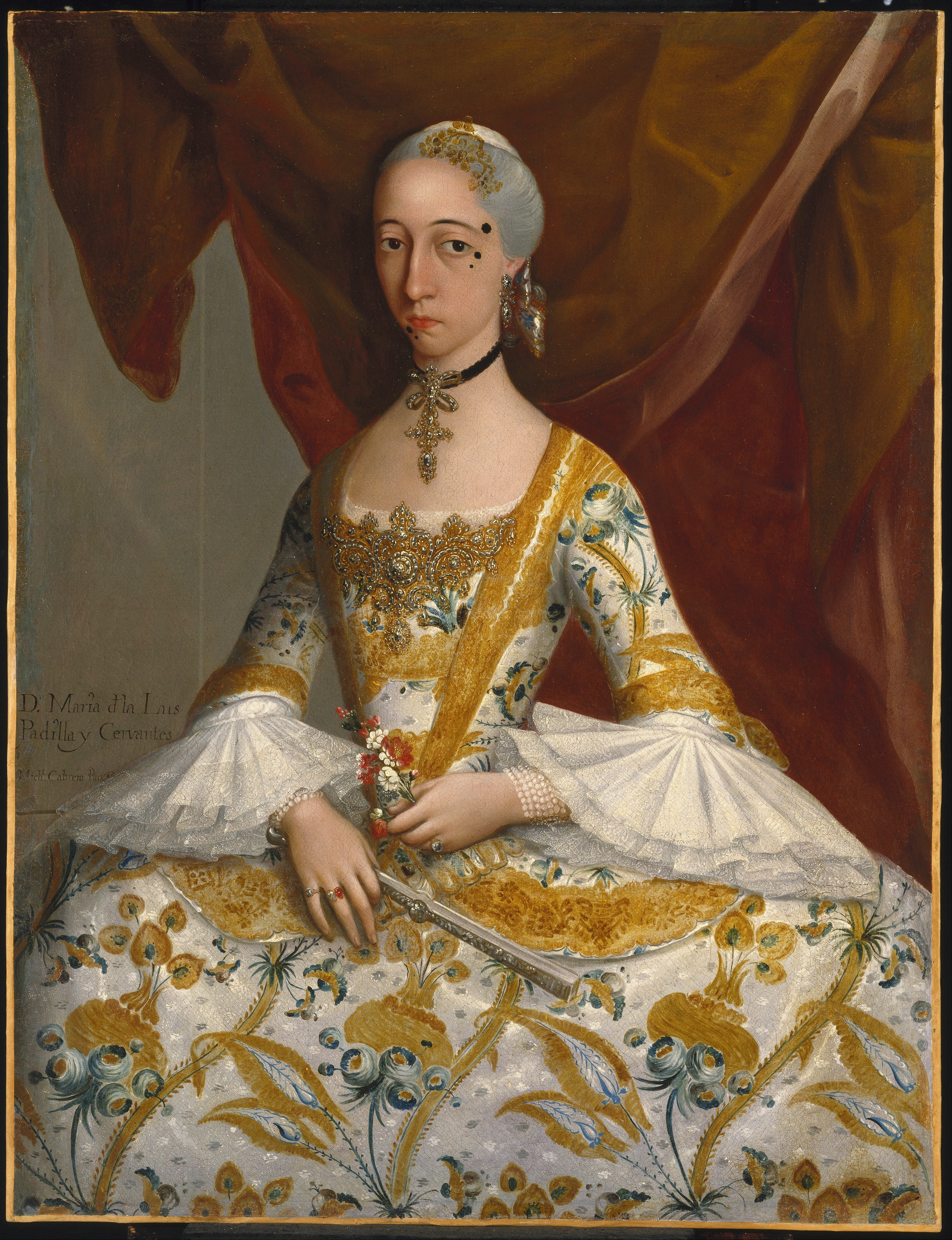
Doña María de la Luz Padilla y Gómez de Cervantes, c. 1760. Oil on canvas. Brooklyn Museum

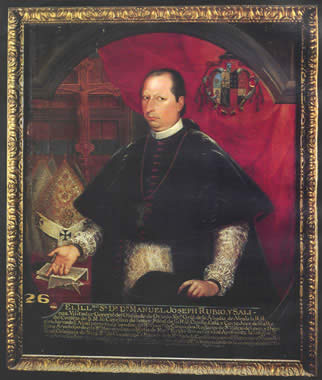
Manuel José Rubio y Salinas, Chapter house - Cathedral of Mexico, oil on canvas, 1758

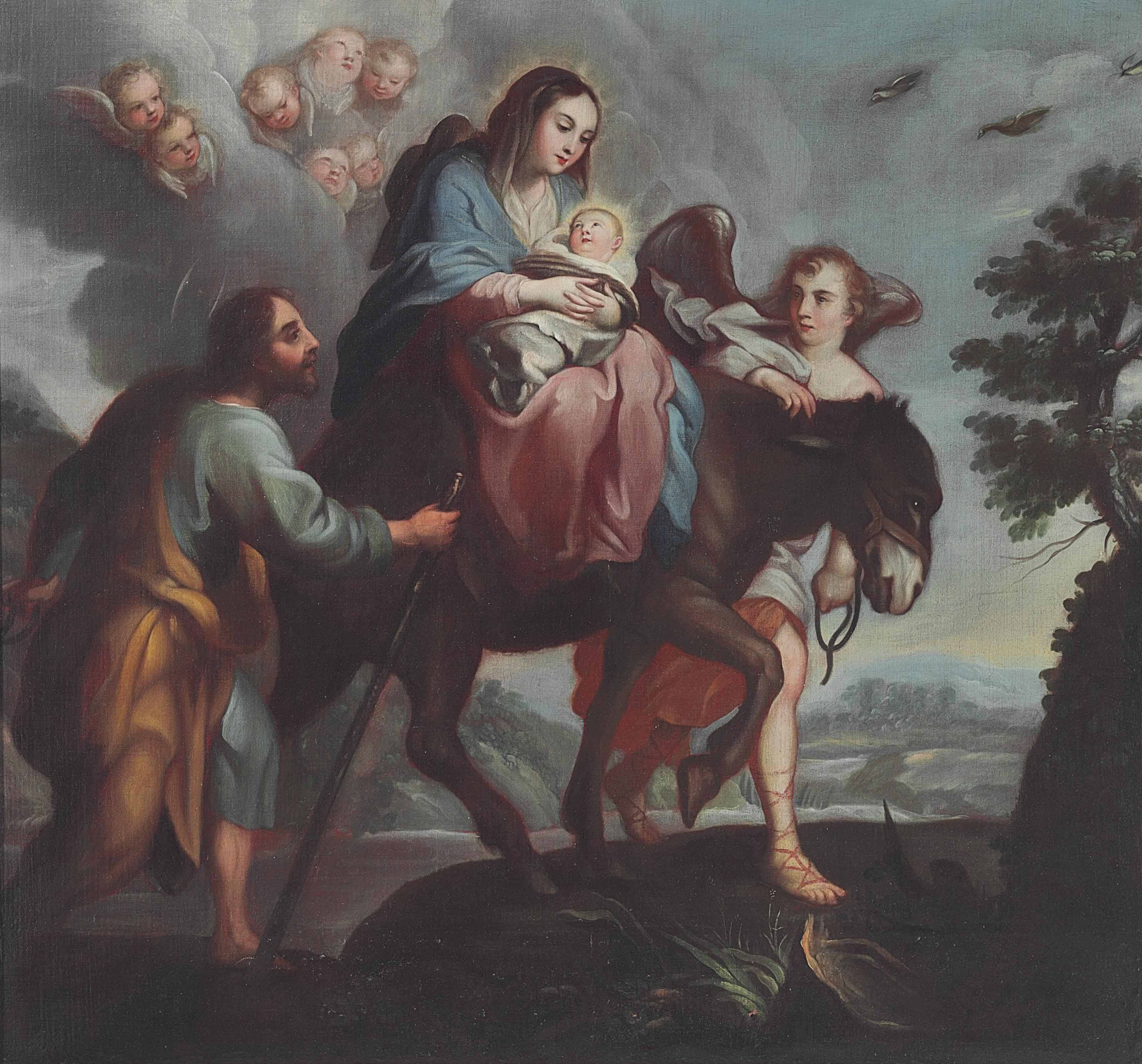
The Flight into Egypt

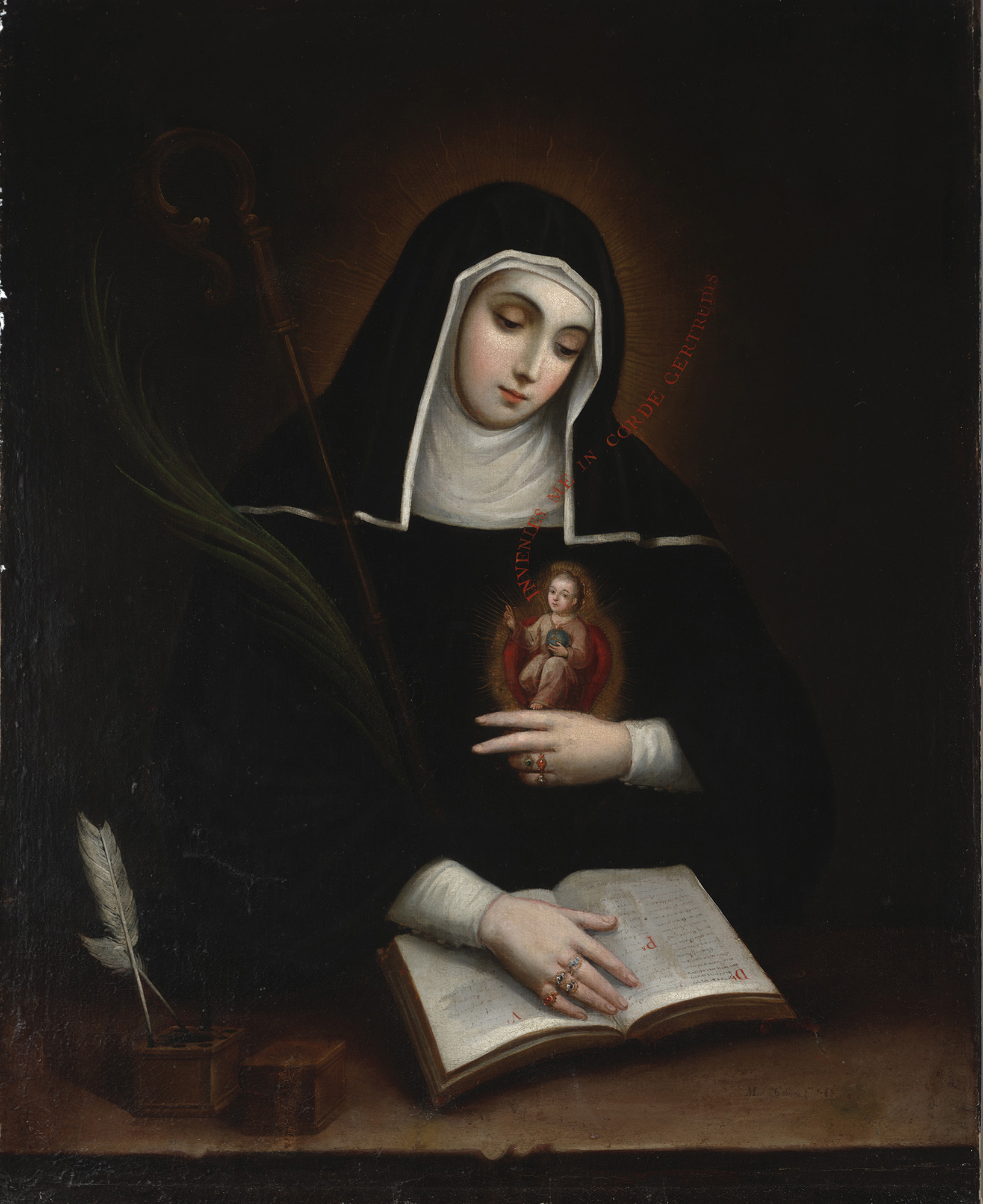
Santa Gertrudis, 1763, Dallas Museum of Art

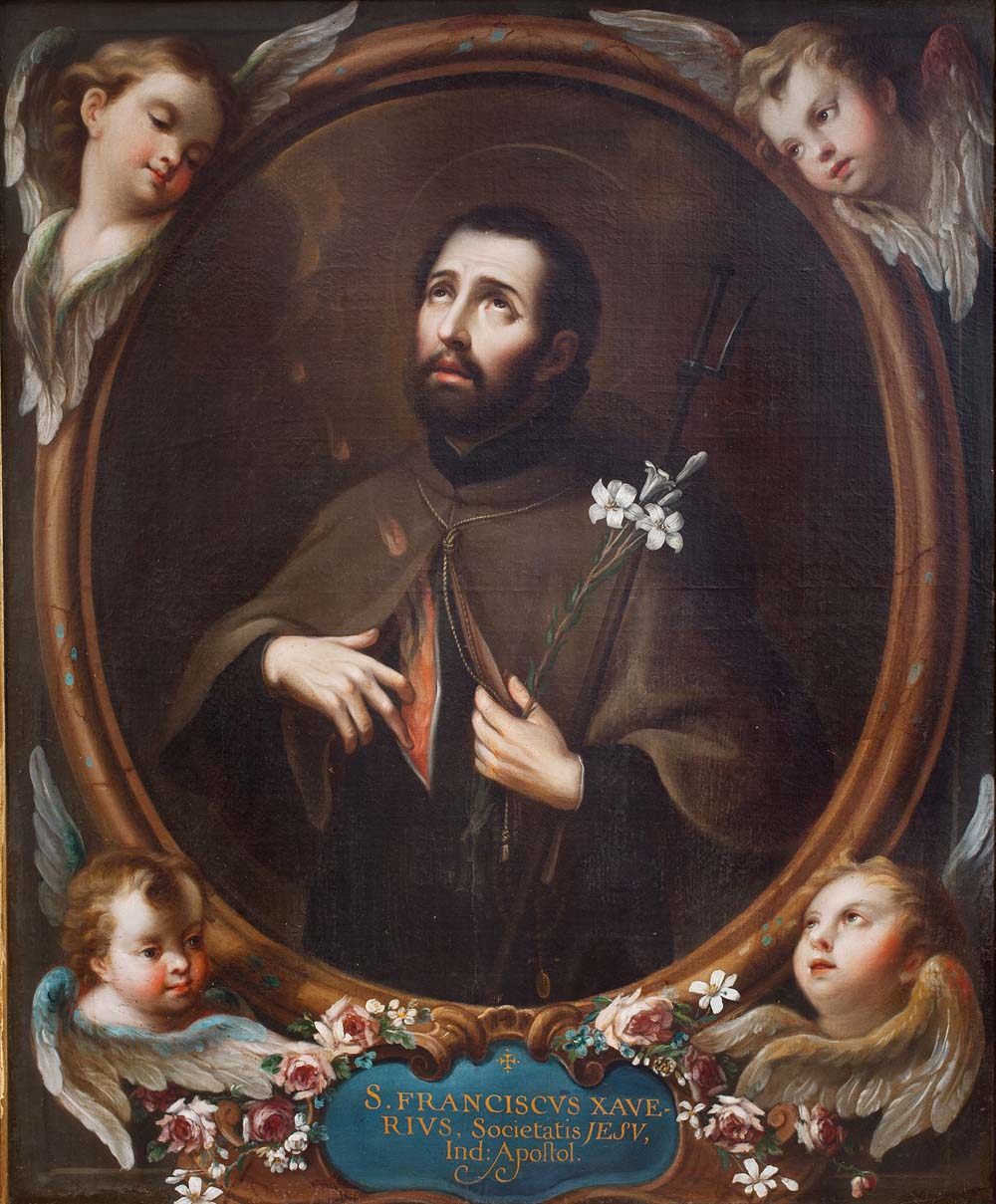
St. Francis Xavier

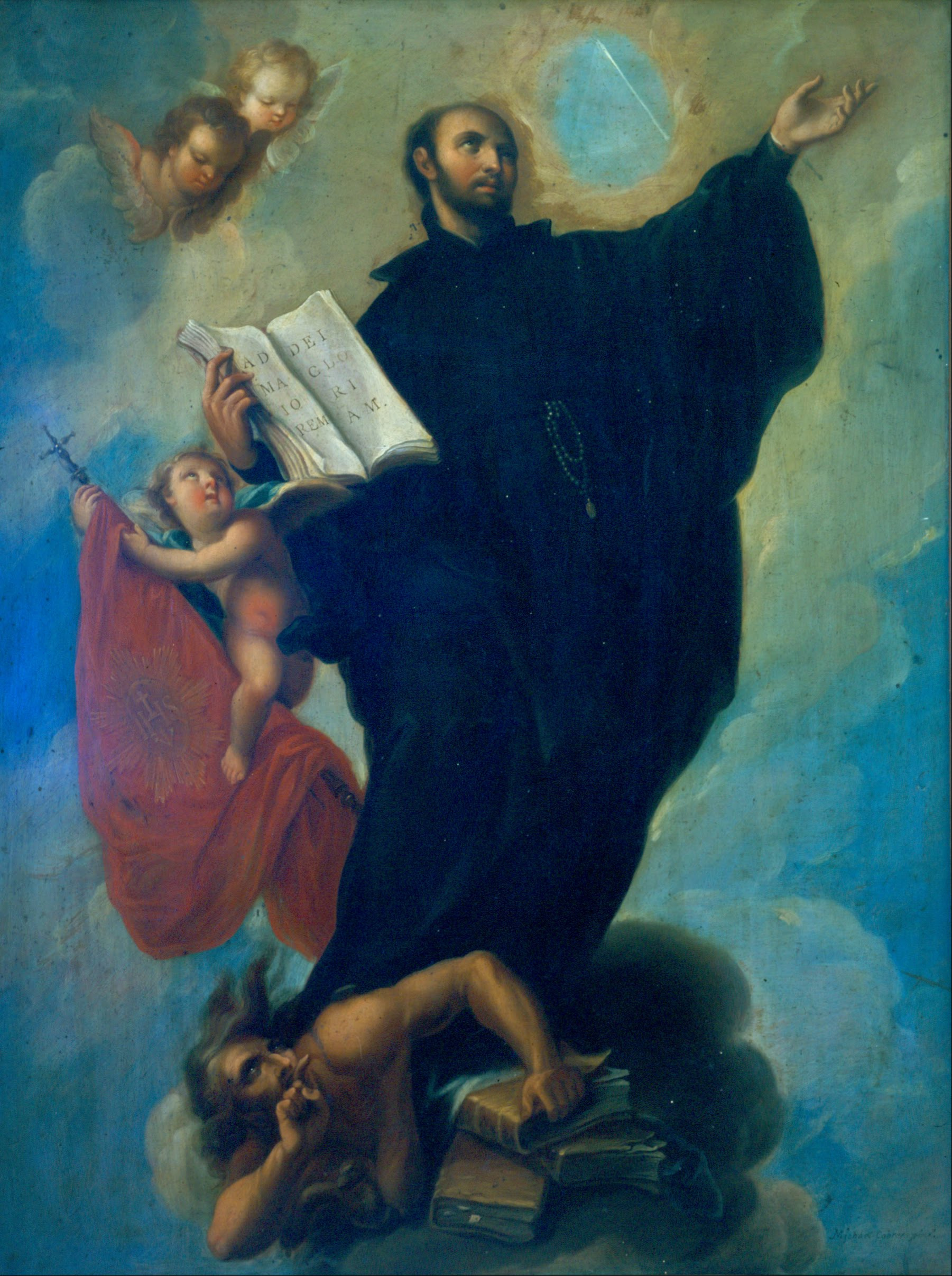
Miguel Cabrera. St. Ignatius of Loyola

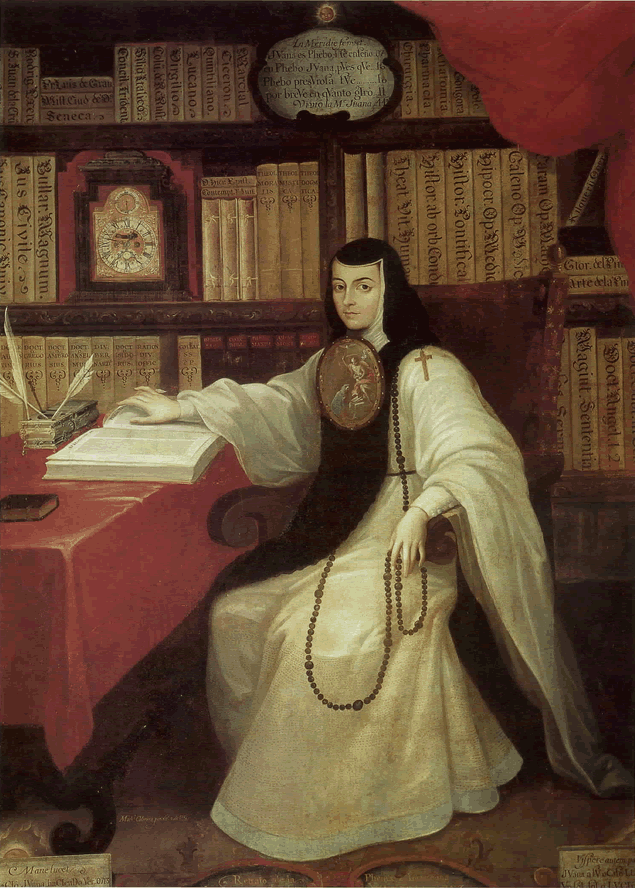
Sor Juana Inés de la Cruz, Mexican nun and savante, posthumous portrait, oil on canvas, 1750

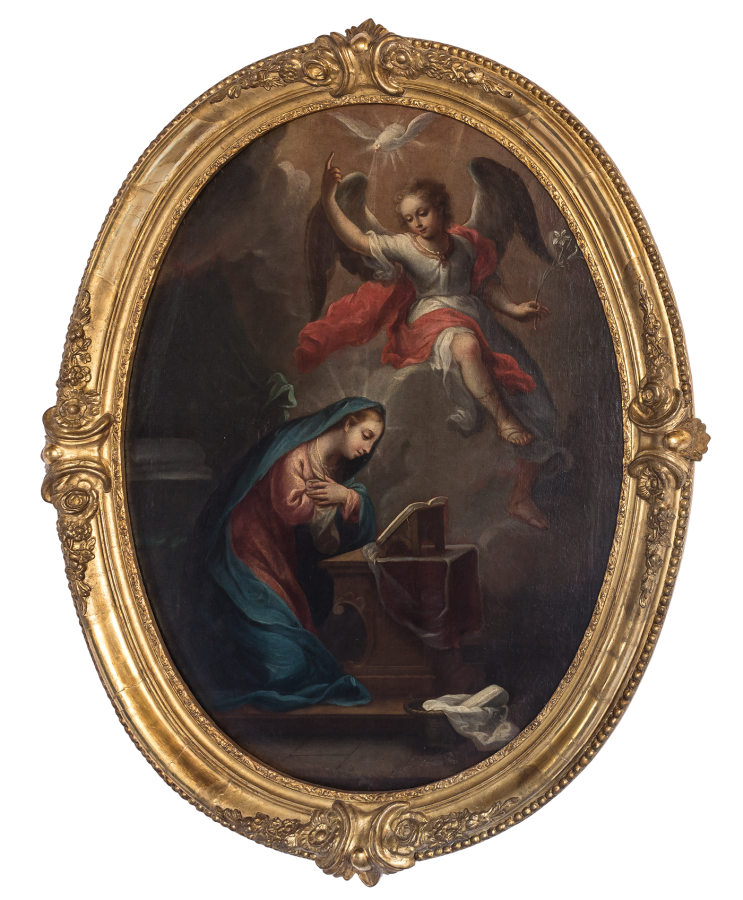
The Annunciation

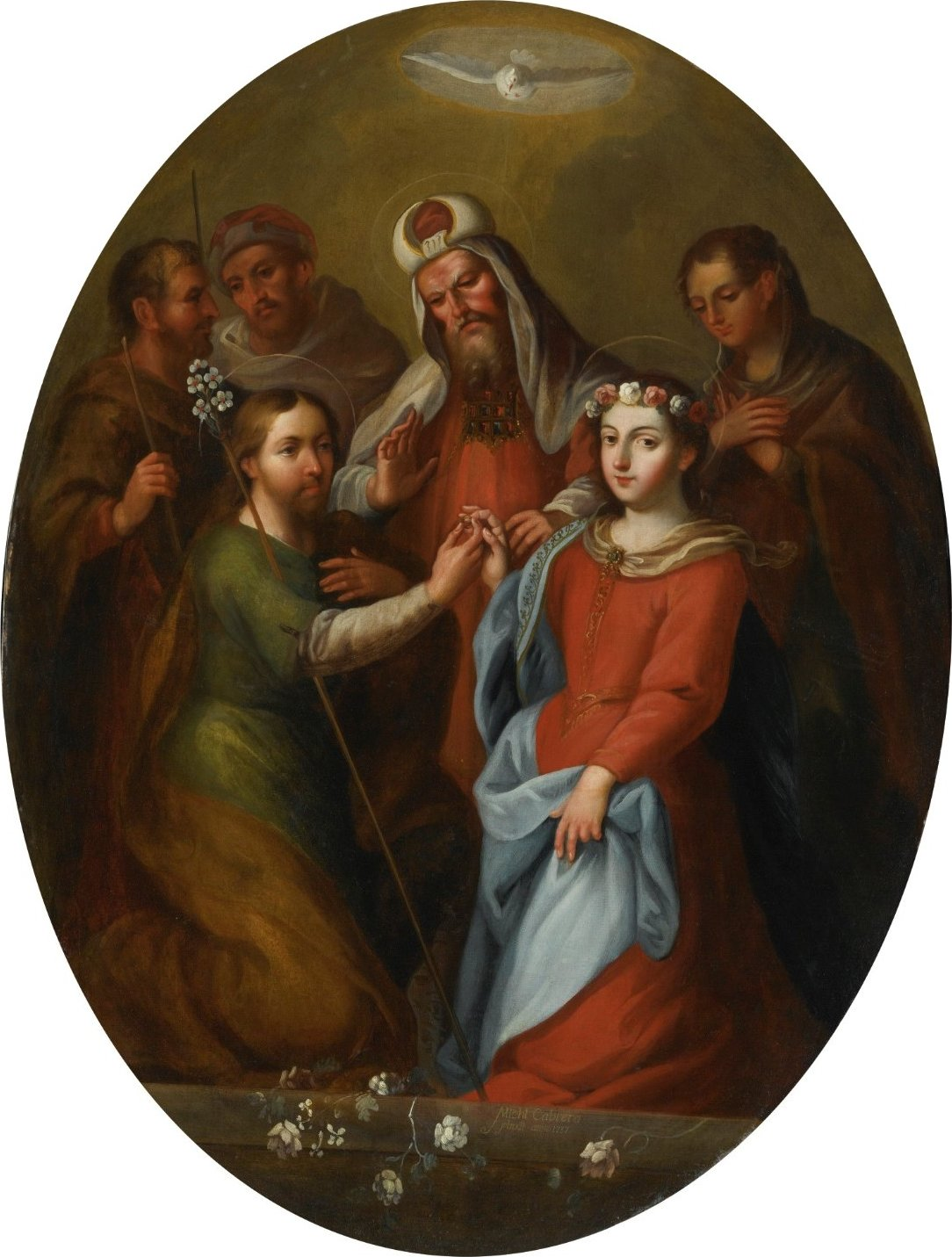
The Marriage of the Virgin

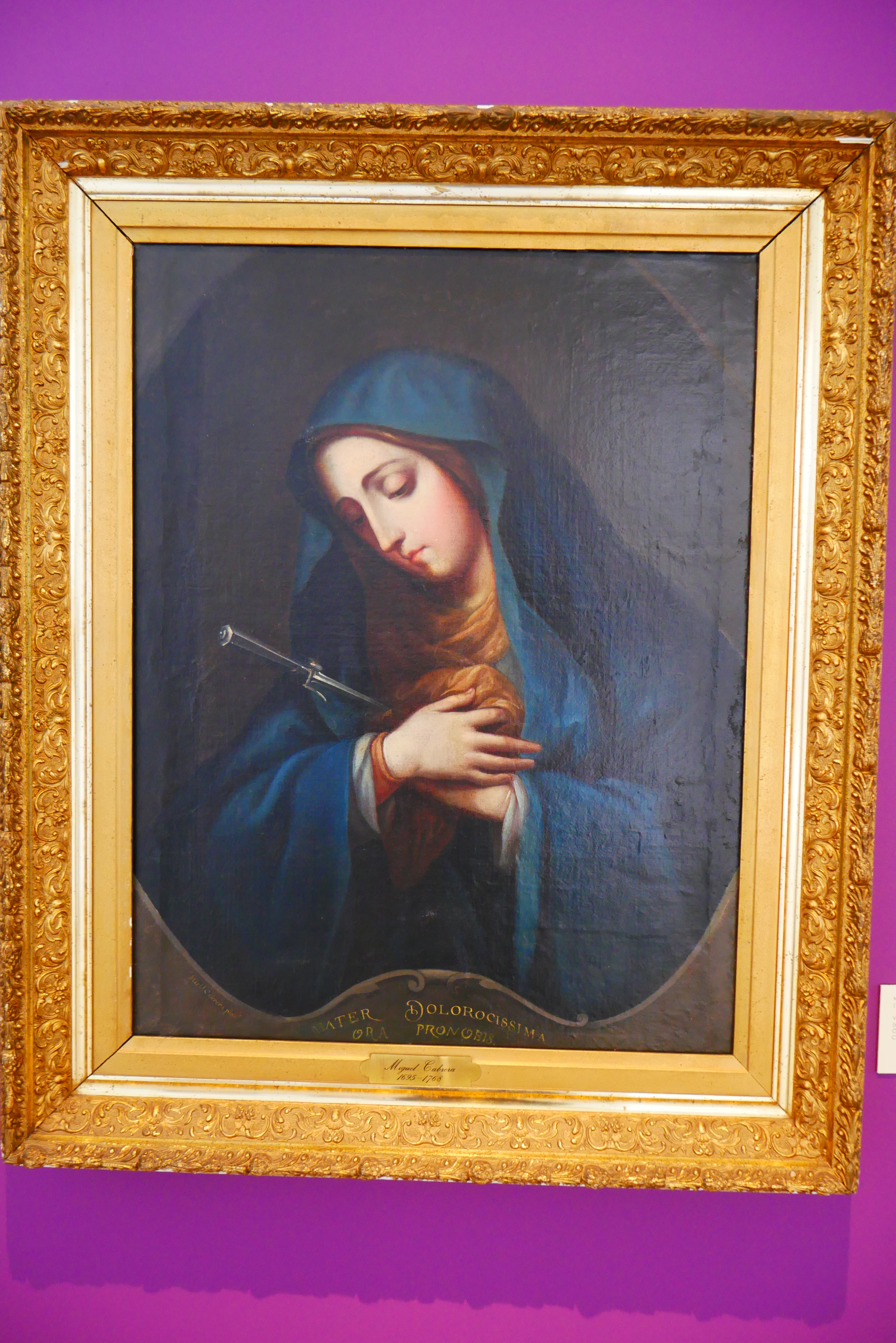
Our Lady of Sorrows

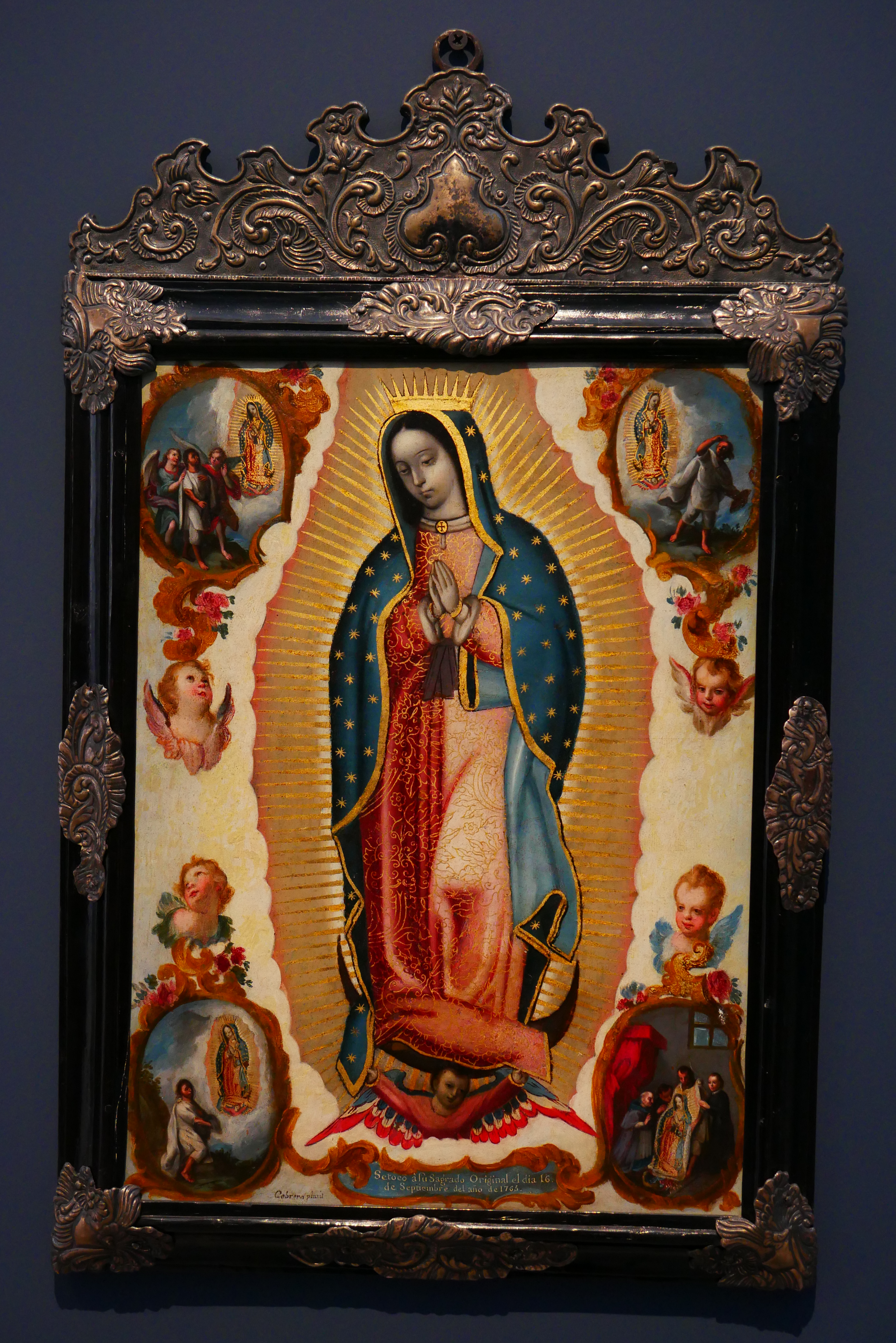
Virgen de Guadalupe

== See also ==
- Casta painting
- Mexican art
