= Radio Educación =

Cultural radio station in Mexico

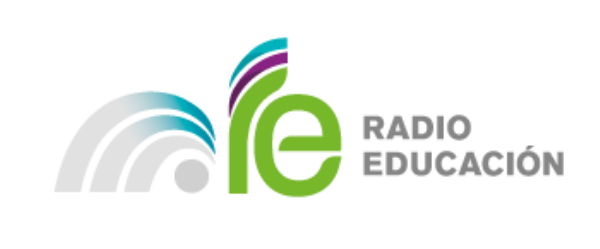

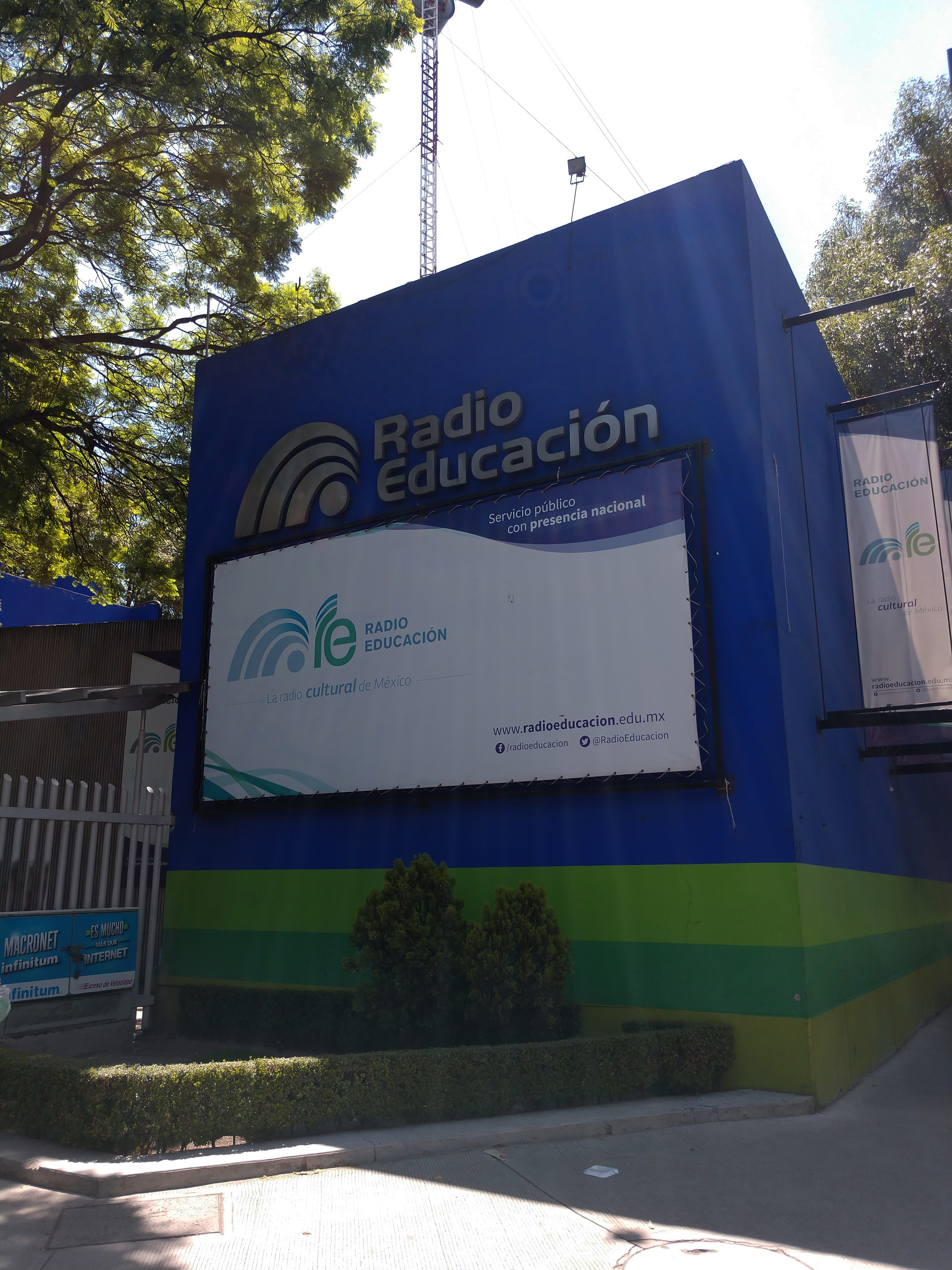
- Mexico City; Mexico
- Broadcast area: Greater Mexico City, some other Mexican cities
- Frequency: See § Stations
- Branding: Radio Educación

Programming
- Format: Spanish cultural

Ownership
- Owner: Radio Educación; (Ministry of Culture)

History
- First air date: November 30, 1924 (original); November 30, 1968 (current)
- Former call signs: CYE (1924); CZE (1924–1928); XFX (1928–1930s); XEEP-AM (1968–2021)

Technical information
- Licensing authority: CRT
- Class: (see table)
- Power: (see table) (AM only)
- ERP: (see table)
- HAAT: (see table) (FM only)

Links
- Webcast: XECPAE-AM
- Website: radioeducacion.edu.mx

Radio Educación is a cultural radio station in Mexico, based in Mexico City. Radio Educación broadcasts Spanish-language cultural and educational programming. The primary broadcast signal is XECPAE-AM (formerly XEEP-AM) 1060 kHz, broadcasting on a North American clear-channel frequency and sharing Class A status with KYW in Philadelphia, Pennsylvania, U.S. Radio Educación also operates a shortwave station, XEPPM-OC on 6.185 MHz, and an FM radio station in Mérida, Yucatán, as well as FM stations to be built at Hermosillo, Sonora, and Morelia, Michoacán.

Radio Educación is an independent agency of the Secretariat of Culture, which was created in 2015. Prior to then, it was operated by the Secretariat of Public Education in cooperation with the National Council for Culture and Arts (CONACULTA).

== History ==
=== Foundation and first era ===
The emergence of radio coincided with one of the most important education policies in Mexican history. Under Secretary of Public Education José Vasconcelos, Mexico went on a literacy crusade. Radio had been considered as a vehicle for cultural programming and the educational mission being carried out by the government, prompting interest from the SEP to enter radio.

On November 21, 1922, Vasconcelos's deputy secretary, Francisco Figueroa, asked President Álvaro Obregón for permission to invest in a 250-watt transmitter and 50 receivers. The federal government initially denied the SEP because it was trying to work with radiotelephone operators, but interest in Mexican radio grew. On June 7, 1923, General Amado Aguirre set guidelines for radio stations, and on July 15, 1924, 13 days after Vasconcelos stepped down, the SEP got its radio station. A transmitter was bought from WEAF in New York and installed on the third floor of the SEP's building. Joaquín Beristáin was charged with designing the first program lineup.

On November 30, 1924, the SEP station began formal operations under the callsign CYE, which was changed within a matter of days to CZE. The station broadcast on 560 kHz with 500 watts. María Luisa Ross was the station's first full director, being named on January 1, 1925. Early programming included telecourses, arts programming, and an early news program.

In 1928, the Dirección General de Telégrafos modified the station's permit, changing the callsign to XFX and its frequency to 910 kHz. With the new frequency, XFX was capable of covering most of Mexico, as well as into other countries. During this time, XFX had several coverage firsts, being the first radio station to report of the assassination of President Obregón and to transmit the criminal trial of his assassin, José León Toral; it frequently did remote broadcasts.

For a brief time, the government showed an interest in expanding the radio service. In 1929, the SEP obtained control of station XFC, which was operated by the state government of Veracruz in Xalapa and broadcast on 860 kHz with 350 watts. However, lack of personnel, poorly maintained equipment and few receivers led to the station being on the air just two years.

As the 1920s became the 1930s, economic conditions in Mexico posed a threat to the continuing operation of Radio Educación. XFX, with programming including long Chamber of Deputies debates and other official acts, simply could not guarantee advertisers continued regular exposure. Interference problems cropped up, and the station used four different frequencies between 1928 and 1933. The station's technical problems in this period were exacerbated by equipment starting to fail, leading to an effective transmitting power of 100 watts, and a new guideline from the Secretariat of Communications and Public Works (SCOP) mandating that radio stations transmitting within population centers move to facilities outside of the city.

In 1933, Agustín Yáñez became Radio Educación's fourth director, after María Luisa Ross, Alejandro Michel, and another term by Ross. It was under Yáñez that the station went through some of its best periods, offering more public educational programming, musical concerts, and courses for rural schools. In 1934, Radio Educación was the key station for the transmission of the dedication of the Palacio de Bellas Artes. He also inaugurated a new transmission facility at 610 kHz, and the station began broadcasting 15 hours a day; the facilities had been acquired from the recently closed station XETR, owned by El Universal.

Educational radio came to its first end under the presidency of Lázaro Cárdenas. The head of Radio Educación from 1934 to 1936 was a military general who had a poor understanding of the station, and his successor, Genaro Ángeles, carried out the process of reorganizing the station. In 1936, Radio Educación, which had briefly carried the callsign XEXM, was transferred to the Autonomous Department of Press and Propaganda (DAPP), which would operate it as a governmental station. On March 15, 1937, XEXM became XEDP. Two years later, the DAPP was dissolved, with XEDP and its shortwave counterpart XEXA becoming "Radio Gobernación", with a decidedly political tone.

=== 1946 revival ===
On November 19, 1946, the SEP returned to radio in the waning days of Manuel Ávila Camacho's presidency with the name "Radio Educación" on two frequencies: XEOF as the "Cultural Voice of Mexico" (Spanish: Vocero Cultural de México) on 560 kHz and XEEP on shortwave. However, just five months later on March 16, 1947, new president Miguel Alemán Valdés decided that the stations should be given to the Interior Secretariat. Radio Educación was consolidated with Radio México, which was labeled "the radio agency of the Government of the Republic", and the SEP sent its programs to be aired on that station and over all other stations during the time that all broadcasters were required to cede to the SEP.

On April 29, 1964, Radio Educación's future shortwave station was authorized as XEICM-OC, operated by the Spanish: Instituto Federal de Capacitación del Magisterio (Federal Teacher Training Institute). The callsign changed on September 21, 1973, to XEPPM.

=== Return to the air ===
When Gustavo Díaz Ordaz became president, he named Agustín Yáñez as head of the SEP. During this time period, a 500-watt transmitter was acquired and installed. In the second half of September 1967, Radio Educación returned to the air on 1060 kHz, but the tests did not last long because of transmitter faults. It was not until 1968 that the facility was rebuilt with a 25 m (82 ft) tower, and using temporary power of 150 watts, Radio Educación returned to the air for good on November 23. The SEP asked for the restoration of the XEEP calls, representing the Secretaría de Educación Pública, but the Secretariat of Communications and Transportation assigned XESED instead; it was not until either 1969 or 1971 that the XEEP calls were definitively reassigned.

The newly relaunched Radio Educación primarily broadcast music, initially popular and later classical, on a "bureaucratic" schedule, broadcasting during working hours from 10am to 2pm and again from 4 to 7 in the afternoon. Experimental programming remained the focus during 1969, and programming began again in 1970 with new telecourses and radio school programs. Radio Educación in the seventies defined itself as "the third possibility in radio" (La tercera posibilidad en la radio), which referred to its attempt to strike a balance between the popular nature of commercial stations and the overly stuffy nature of university radio (such as Radio UNAM) at the time. It also emphasized the sorts of radio programs that had gone by the wayside when stations began merely playing recorded music.

In 1978, Radio Educación was formally constituted as a separate subsidiary of the SEP by Acuerdo 21, which outlined the goals of the station as supporting open education and teaching; the broadcast of programs of cultural and civic interest; and airing programming to raise the cultural awareness of the population. Under the management of Miguel Ángel Granados Chapa, new news and discussion programs were added in an attempt to create more balance with the musical programming.

In 1980, Granados Chapa, a journalist by trade, opted to leave his government job, and was replaced by José Antonio Álvarez Lima. While programming became "more sober and institutional", with more time for educational programs and shorter newscasts, Radio Educación also began 24-hour broadcasts and returned to shortwave with XEPPM, broadcasting on 6185 kHz in the 49-meter band. When Álvarez Lima left to seek (and later win) election to the Chamber of Deputies in 1982, he was replaced ultimately by Héctor Murillo Cruz, who sought to increase the connection between Radio Educación and other institutional outlets, such as Notimex, programming from the new Instituto Mexicano de la Radio (IMER) and other state institutions, and even commercial advertising for the state-owned airline Aeroméxico, something normally proscribed for noncommercial permit stations. All of this came with a much-increased emphasis on talk programming, going from an even balance in 1985 to comprising 85 percent of the broadcast day by October 1988.

By the time the 1980s were drawing to a close, Radio Educación had lost musical audiences to new FM stations, such as Rock 101 and WFM, been edged out in news and discussion programming by José Gutiérrez Vivó's Monitor on XERED and XHRED, one of Mexico's first longform newscasts, and seen its once-unique style be adopted by other cultural stations thanks to Radio Educación's remit to train other noncommercial broadcasters. More generally, the 80s had seen a dramatic shift in audience listening from AM to FM. In 1991, after three years under Alejandro Montaño, Luis Ernesto Pi Orozco became the new director of Radio Educación, beginning the longest tenure in the station's history, reemphasizing a balance between talk and music programming, with new entertainment- and information-oriented shows. Among the programs produced during the period were shows aimed at women, those dealing with health, and pioneering programming for the gay community helmed by actor Tito Vasconcelos. Additionally, Radio Educación's newscasts took on the name Pulso in a bid to make them more recognizable on the station.

Lidia Camacho ran Radio Educación from 2000 to 2007, when she was replaced by Virginia Bello. Bello resigned in 2009 and was replaced by Antonio Tenorio.

=== Expansion, a new agency and FM migration ===
One of the consistent problems faced by Radio Educación in recent decades is the difficulty it has faced in moving from AM to FM. In 2008, a large government plan was put in place to move as many AM radio stations as possible to FM. However, in Mexico City, the FM band was already considered full because Mexico still required station spacing of 800 kHz. In 2009, twice in 2012 and again in 2014, Radio Educación petitioned telecommunications regulators to give it an FM frequency.

On January 23, 2017, with Mexico's minimum station spacing reduced to 400 kHz and a new process to migrate AM radio stations in some large cities, Radio Educación made another petition, and this time, it was granted. XHEP-FM began technical tests on October 23, 2018. The Secretariat of Culture then applied for a new concession to retain the AM service, which was granted as XECPAE-AM in 2021.

Another process of expansion began geographically. In 2012, Radio Educación applied for FM radio stations at Hermosillo, Morelia and Mérida. The first of the stations to be awarded was the Mérida station. In December 2015, XHYRE-FM 107.9, now known as Radio Educación Señal Kukulkán, began operations, with full independent programming coming in 2017. The other applications remained as such for years. In December 2017, the Hermosillo station, XHFLO-FM 104.3, was awarded when the Federal Telecommunications Institute cleared a backlog of old permit applications for radio stations in that city. The Morelia station, XHIAM-FM 95.3, was awarded in a similar process in that city in March 2018.

Another major change in the 2010s related to government structure. On December 17, 2015, the Secretariat of Culture was created, absorbing culture-related units from other agencies including Radio Educación and Canal 22. In 2018, Radio Educación's statutes were updated.

== Stations ==
Radio Educación currently operates six frequencies nationwide. When it signs on, XEEP-AM and XHEP-FM will form a simulcast for a period of one year.

Callsign	Name	City	Class	Frequency	Power/ERP	HAAT (FM only)	Transmitter coordinates
XECPAE-AM	Cultura 1060 AM	Mexico City	A	1060 kHz	100 kW day 20 kW night	none	19°21′50.3″N 99°01′37.9″W
XHEP-FM	Cultura 96.5 FM	Mexico City	A	96.5 MHz (HD Radio)	6 kW	−34.4 m (−113 ft)	19°23′01.6″N 99°10′09.9″W
XEPPM-OC	Cultura México Señal Internacional	Mexico City	none	6.185 MHz	10 kW	none	19°21′50.3″N 99°01′37.9″W
XHYRE-FM	Señal Kukulkán	Mérida, Yucatán	A	107.9 MHz (HD Radio)	3 kW	45.44 m (149.1 ft)	20°59′10.55″N 89°37′53.8″W
XHFLO-FM	Señal Cultura Sonora	Hermosillo, Sonora	A	104.3 MHz	3 kW	80.8 m (265 ft)	none
XHIAM-FM	Señal Cultura Michoacán	Morelia, Michoacán	B1	95.3 MHz	6,000 kW	219.7 m (721 ft)	none
