= Jesús Martín-Barbero =

Colombian academic (1937–2021)

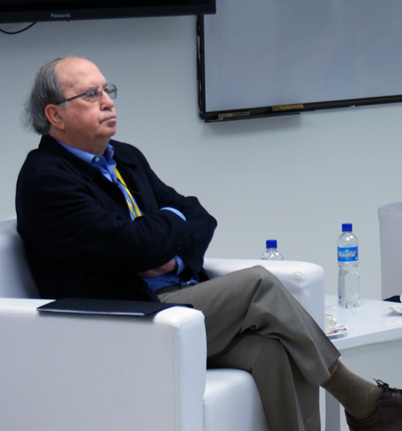
Jesús Martín-Barbero at Universidad EAFIT

Jesús Martín-Barbero (3 October 1937 – 12 June 2021) was a Spanish-Colombian communication scientist.

== Biography ==
Born in Ávila, Spain in 1937, he lived in Colombia since 1963; he also published as Jesús Martin B. He was a Doctor of Philosophy (PhD), and was a specialist in culture and media. Most of his published books are in Spanish; some have been translated into other languages.

His most important work is Communication, Culture and Hegemony From the Media to the Mediations. According to WorldCat, this work is in 350 libraries.

He studied philosophy at the Institute of Philosophy in Leuven, Belgium, where he received his doctorate in 1971, and did postdoctoral studies in Anthropology and Semiotics at the School of Advanced Studies in Paris. He was Director of the Communication Department of the Universidad del Valle in Cali (Colombia), where he remained between 1975 and 1995. Between 1999 and 2003 he was teaching at Instituto Tecnologico y de Estudios Superiores de Occidente in Guadalajara, Mexico. He was a visiting professor at the Complutense University of Madrid, Autonomous of Barcelona, Stanford, Free of Berlin, King's College of London, Puerto Rico, Buenos Aires, São Paulo, Lima, et cetera. In 2003, he obtained Colombian nationality. Doctor honoris causa by the National University of Rosario (Argentina) and the Pontificia Universidad Javeriana de Bogotá (Colombia), he was president of ALAIC (Latin American Association of Communication Researchers), member of the Advisory Committee of FELAFACS (Latin American Federation of Faculties of Social Communication). He was member of the Scientific Committee of Infoamérica.

He published the following books: Mass Communication: discourse and power, Ciespal, Quito, 1978; Educational and didactic audiovisual communication, SENA, Cali, 1979; Introduction to content analysis, Incisex, Madrid, 1981; From media to mediations, G. Gili, Barcelona. 1987; Communication and popular cultures in Latin America, G. Gili, Mexico, 1987; Communication processes and culture matrices, G. Gili, Mexico, 1989; Television and melodrama, Third World, Bogotá, 1992; Communication, Culture and Hegemony, Sage, London, 1993; Dynamic urban culture, in: Communication and cultural centers in Latin America, Bogota, UNESCO Chair in Social Communication, Universidad Javeriana, 1994; Pre-texts: talks about communication and their contexts, Univalle, Cali. nineteen ninety five; Projecting communication (with A. Silva). Third World, Bogotá, 1997; Night maps, Siglo del Hombre Editores, Bogotá, 1998; Media, Culture and Society (with Fabio Lopez), CES / Univ. National, Bogotá, 1998; The exercises of ver. Hegemony and audiovisual television fiction (with Germán Rey), Gedisa, Barcelona, 2000.

Martín-Barbero died from complications of COVID-19 on June 12, 2021 at the age of 84, in Cali, during the COVID-19 pandemic in Colombia.

== Honours ==
- Emeritus Professor of Universidad del Valle (Colombia)
- Honorary Professor of Universidad de Lima (Perú)
- Honorary Professor of Universidad Nacional de La Plata (Argentina)
- Honorary Professor of Universidad Andina (Quito)
- Doctor Honoris Causa by Universidad Nacional de Rosario (Argentina)
- Doctor Honoris Causa by Universidad Javeriana de Bogotá (Colombia)
- Doctor Honoris Causa by Universidad de Cuyo, Mendoza (Argentina)
- Doctor Honoris Causa by Universidad de Antioquia (Colombia)

He was cultural politics consultant for UNESCO, OEI and CAB (Convenio Andrés Bello), a member of the Social Science National Council of Colciencias (Colombia), and a member of the Culture National Council, Civil Media Area.

== Published books ==
- 1978: Comunicación masiva: discurso y poder, Ciespal, Quito.
- 1979: Comunicación educativa y didáctica audiovisual, SENA, Cali.
- 1981: Introducción al análisis de contenido, Incisex, Madrid.
- 1987: De los medios a las mediaciones, Gustavo Gili, Barcelona.
  - English Translation: Communication, Culture and Hegemony, Sage, London, 1992. ISBN 9780803984899
  - Portuguese translation: Dos meios ‘as mediacoes', UFR, Rio de Janeiro, 1997.
  - French translation: Des médias aux mediations, CNRS, Paris, 2002.
- 1988: Procesos de comunicación y matrices de cultura, Gustavo Gili, México.
- 1992: Televisión y melodrama, Tercer Mundo, Bogotá.
- 1995: Pre-textos: conversaciones sobre la comunicación y sus contextos, Univalle, Cali.
- 1998: (co-author) Mapas nocturnos. Diálogos con la obra de J. Martín-Barbero, Siglo del Hombre/DIUC, Bogotá.
- 1999: with German Rey, Los ejercicios del ver. Hegemonía audiovisual y fición televisa, Gedisa, Barcelona.
- 2000: with Hermann Herlingahus, Contemporaneidad latinoamericana y análisis cultural, Iberoamericana/Vevuert, Madrid.
- 2001: Al sur de la modernidad. Comunicación, globalización y multiculturalidad. Instituto Internacional de Literatura Iberoamericana, University of Pittsburgh.
- 2002: Oficio de cartógrafo. Travesias latinoamericanas de la comunicación en la cultura, Fondo de Cultura Económica, Santiago de Chile. La educación desde la comunicación, Norma, Buenos Aires.
- 2003: (Co-author) El espacio cultural latinoamericano. Bases para una política Cultural de integración, Convenio Andrés Bello / Fondo de Cultura Económica, Santiago de Chile.
