= José Manuel Ponce =

Mexican race car driver

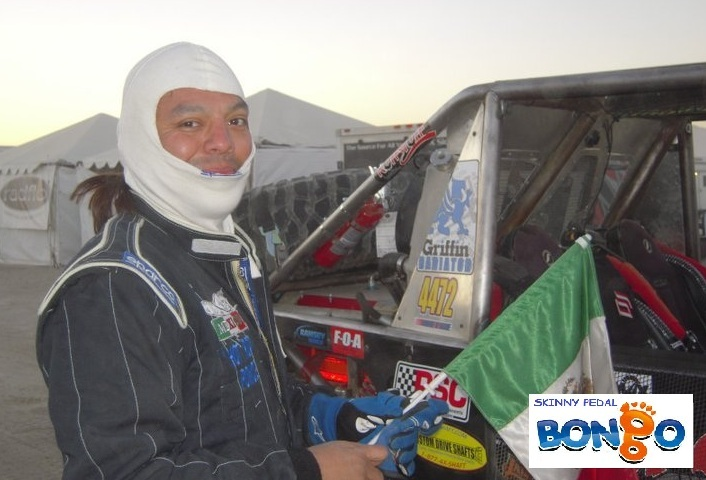
José Manuel Ponce

José Manuel Ponce (born in Morelia, Michoacán, Mexico) is a Mexican race car driver who participates in extreme rock crawling, desert rock racing, and rallying. He is part Purépecha. Ponce currently owns and is the main driver for World Rally Team based out of Arendal, Norway.

== Rock crawling ==
Ponce began participating in off-road racing in 2002 in Mexico at the Ramsey Off Road Challenge events. Ponce introduced the motorsport of professional rock crawling into Mexico by organizing and promoting UROC México in 2006.

In 2006, Ponce became the first Mexican to participate and finish at the UROC (United Rock Crawling and Off Road Challenge) Super Crawl VI Extreme Rock Crawling World Championship held in Phoenix, Arizona, at the Firebird International Raceway.

In 2007, he founded and promoted MXRRA (Mexico Rock Racing Association), an event sanctioned by XRRA, held in Guanajuato, México. During 2007-2009 Ponce also attended various Texas trail runs to continue promotion of his US-sanctioned rock crawling and rock racing events that were held in Mexico.

Ponce co-drove alongside Tore Hansen, Norwegian off road champion, in the Nordic and Euro Trials of Norway in 2007 and 2008, finishing fourth on both occasions.

Ponce and co-driver Johnny Despain placed third in the modified class at the MOROC Rock Race 2009 held in Spring, Texas.

== Rallying ==
Ponce participated in the 2008 Rally México, placing 26th from 29 finishers overall, eighth from 11 finishers in class A6, and 2nd in the Reto Peugeot 206 Mexican Class. He was named rookie driver amongst the Mexican teams and awarded the Bernardo Audibert Cup. Ponce had no previous rally experience, and raced in a rental Peugeot 206 XS with street tires.

In 2009, Ponce raced as the first Mexican to ever participate at the VENEZUELA Fun Race, a race held in the amazon jungle in Venezuela. Ponce navigated Team Roberti to a 16th spot of out 200 teams.

In 2010 Ponce returned with co-driver Bill Bridge to race once again at WRC Rally México 2010. He finished 25th from 25 finishers in general classification and a 2nd place from 2 finishers in class A6.

In 2012, Ponce drove for Team WERK1 along with the Paris Dakar Legend Jutta Kleinschmidt and Michael R. Podlogar at the GORM (German Off Road Masters) 24 hour race in Germany. Ponce raced a total of 14 laps out of 40 for Team WERK1 to place 5th in Class T2 and 16th overall. This was the first time a Mexican American competed in this endurance race known to many as the Nürburgring of off road racing in Germany.

== Desert rock racing ==
In 2009, Ponce participated with teammates Heath Catron and Johnny Despain in the last chance qualifier at the King of the Hammers. In, 2010, he tried the LCQ once again with teammate Bill Bridge

In 2011, Ponce along with teammate Dave Gutwillig finished the King of the Hammers, placing 37th out of 100 teams. Ponce was the first Mexican to ever compete in and finish this endurance race. The Ultra 4 race vehicle was built by Dave Gutwillig and sponsored by Javier Ibarra.

== Acting career ==
Ponce was discovered in 2011 by Discovery Channel UK after being the first and only Mexican to finish the King of the Hammers and 2 WRC Mexico events with a super low budget. He was selected as one of the finalist to appear in the show One Car Too Far but the producers changed the concept of that show and later offered Ponce a bilingual host spot on another project entitled Brains vs Brawns, but Discovery Channel cancelled that project. After this Ponce took on the stage name Hotrod Ponce as part of his marketing strategy in the film world. All this helped open some doors to new projects and in 2014 he was promoted by some private elite contacts to appear in the UK film, Gatwick Gangsters, where he played the role of an international cartel leader hiding in Norway alongside real life gangsters like Dave Courtney.

In the fall of 2014, Ponce began to write, direct and film The Ultimate Rally, a movie based on the truth about racing as an underdog racer and his real life adventures. At this time Ponce was residing in Norway and began to film there using his own vehicles and friends. In 2015, he continued to film on the border of Texas and in exotic places in Mexico and Belize until he finished in 2017. Unlike other Hollywood films Ponce modified and prepped all the vehicles that appear in this indie action film with the help of parts sponsored by his race partners. He also planned and performed all the stunts. He brainstormed the idea of using no actors and no camera crew to tell his unique documentary story which featured Norwegian, Spanish, Slovenian, English languages giving it an international appeal. The film has been released on Vimeo on deman on January 1, 2018 and dedicated to his younger brother and guitar legend, Louie Guitmousse Ponce.

== Filmography ==
- Gatwick Gangsters (2017) ... Hotrod Ponce - La Mano Negra IMDB
- The Ultimate Rally (2018) ... Hotrod Ponce IMDB
