= Symbols of Morelia =

The flag of Morelia, Mexico, was adopted as a symbol of the city on 1991.

== Coat of arms ==
Seal of Morelia.

The coat of arms of Morelia is made up of three quarters of gold fields, each with a king dressed in purple with a scepter in his hands. At the top it has a royal crown with blue, red and green rhinestone studs and on the edges it has black and gold foliage with studs.

=== History ===
The Spanish under Viceroy Antonio de Mendoza founded a settlement here in 1541 with the name of Valladolid, which became rival to the nearby city of Pátzcuaro for dominance in Michoacán. In 1580, this rivalry ended in Valladolid's favor, and it became the capital of the viceregal province.

== Flag ==
Morelia
- Morelia
- Use: Civil flag, civil and state ensign
- Proportion: 3:2
- Adopted: 1991

It is formed by a yellow horizontal strip, which occupies the upper half, and a red horizontal strip, which complements the lower part. In the center is the coat of arms of the city.

=== History ===
Flag of Michoacán Province (1537–1625)

Flag of Valladolid City (1625-1991)

== Hymn ==
The hymn was written by Sara Malfavón, poet from Morelia City, in Michoacán.

=== Lyrics ===
Himno a Morelia

[Chorus]
A Morelia entusiastas cantemos
en un Himno sonoro y triunfal;
y a los cuatro confines llevemos
de su historia la fecha inmortal.

[I]
Sobre el dorso sutil de una loma
oriflama en la puesta del sol
te levantas cual grácil paloma,
inundada de tenue arrebol…
A la luz de la tibia mañana
tu silueta parece emerger
como copia de fiel Castellana
que conserva su estirpe de ayer.

[II]
Circuindada de valles y montes
Atalayas que guardan tu honor
en tus ansias de ampliar horizontes
vas en pos de un progreso mayor.
Y a la voz de ese afán ya se escucha
cual si fuese una dulce canción,
en un canto armonioso de Lucha
que es Trabajo, Cultura y Acción.

[III]
Son tus torres y cúpulas unas
raras joyas que irradian su luz
en las noches calladas y brunas
semienvueltas en denso capuz..
Y tus viejos rincones en calma
do el recuerdo parece temblar,
son remansos tranquilos que el alma
invitándola están a soñar.

[IV]
Tú le diste su cuna a Morelos
y Morelos su nombre te dió…
y en la comba auroral de tus cielos
como Hidalgo un Ocampo surgió.
Tus poetas y sabios te dieron
de sus triunfos el fresco laurel
y a tus plantas, Señora, pusieron
lira y pluma, paleta y pincel.

[V]
Loor y pres al Virrey de Mendoza
que al fundarte dos razas unió,
para él esta estrofa que glosa
cuatro siglos que el tiempo guardó.
Loor a él, repitamos en coco,
al compás de un acorde marcial
y guardemos con letras de oro
esta fecha de limpio historial.
