= Morelia =

City of Michoacán, Mexico

- City
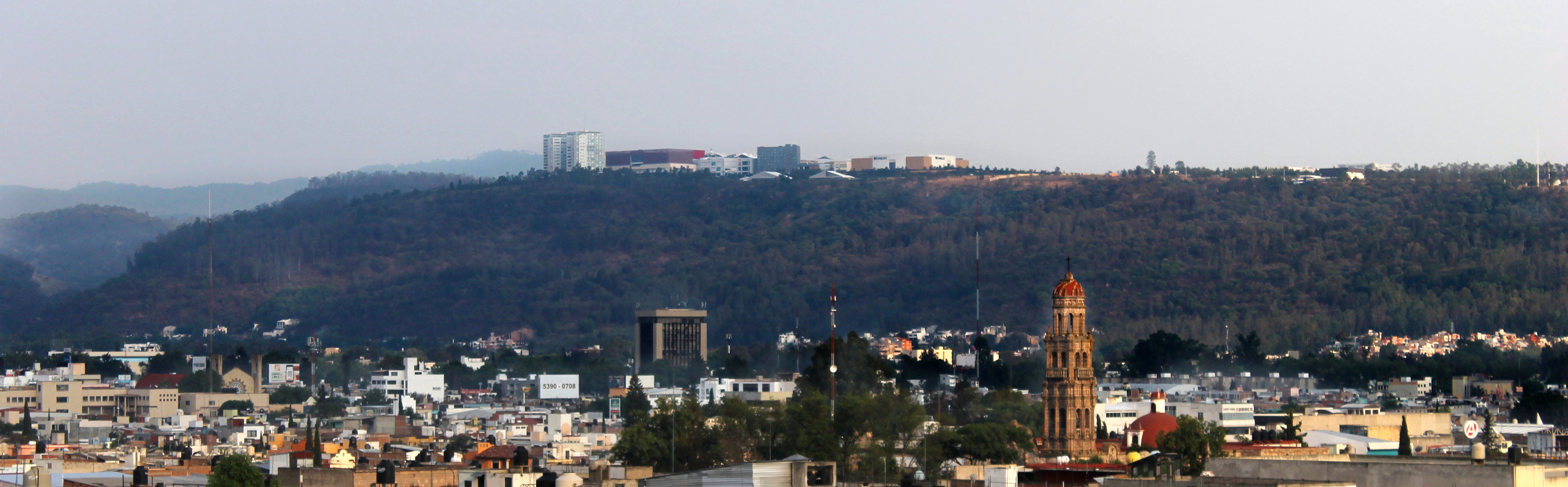
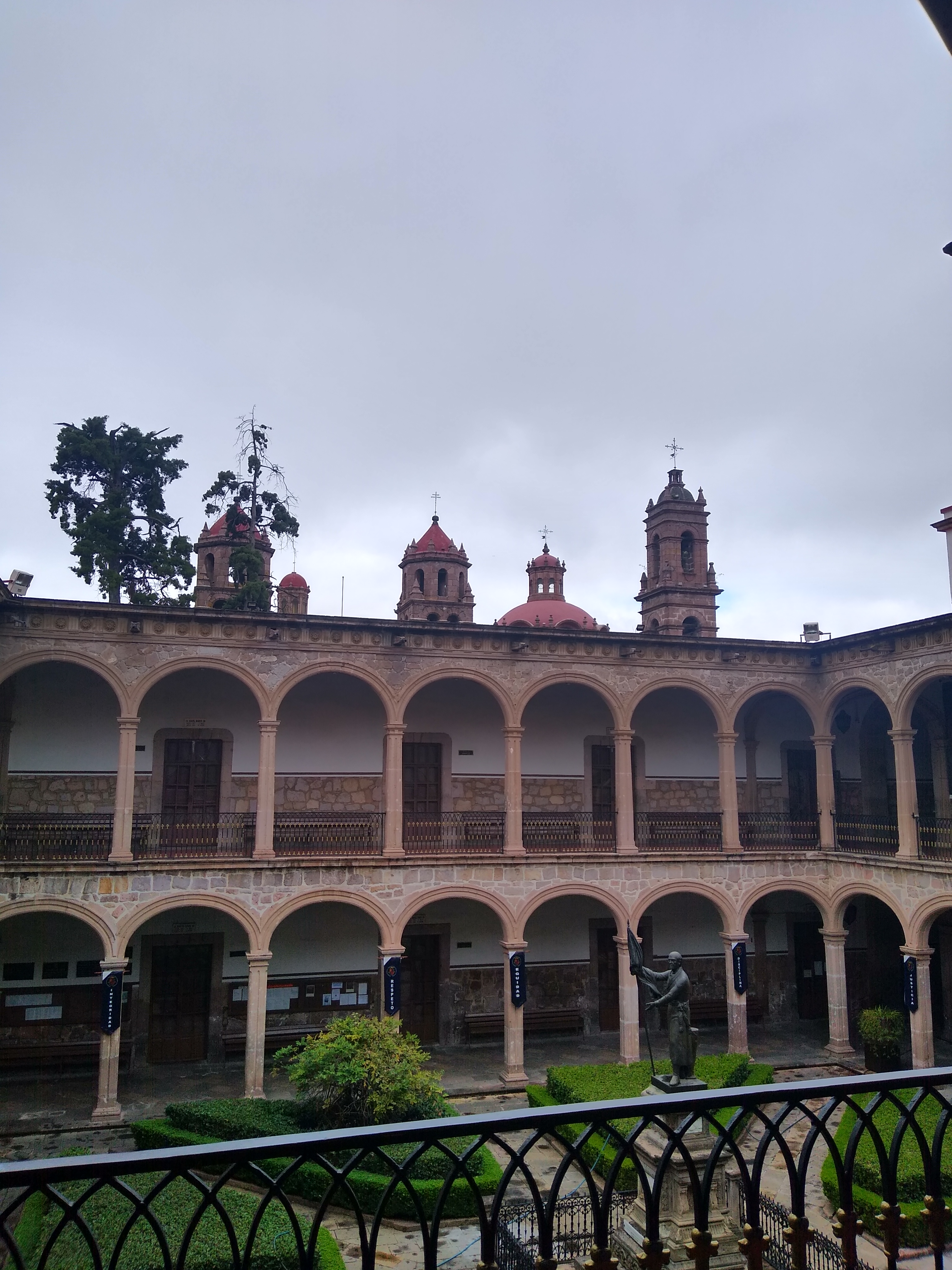
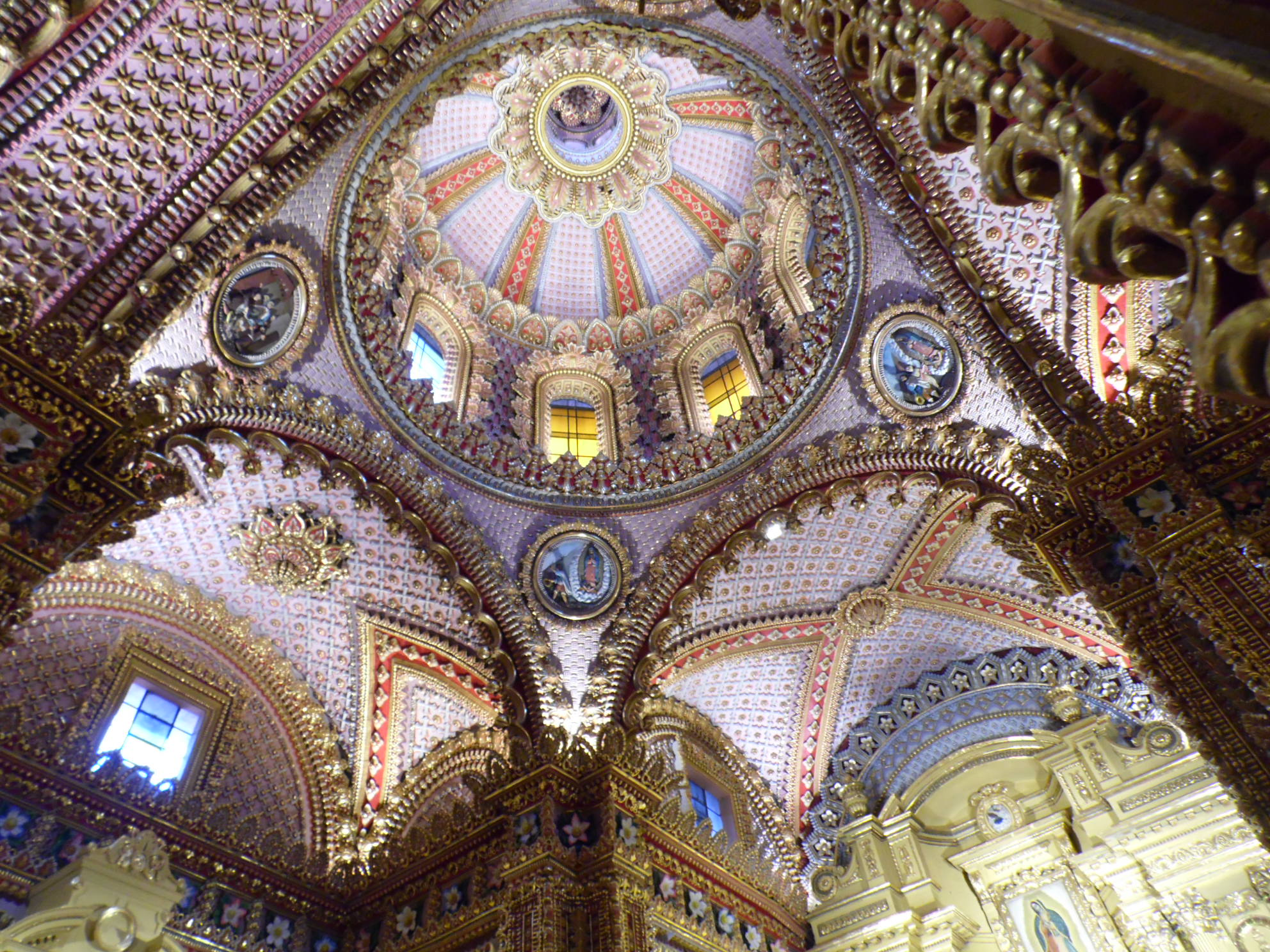
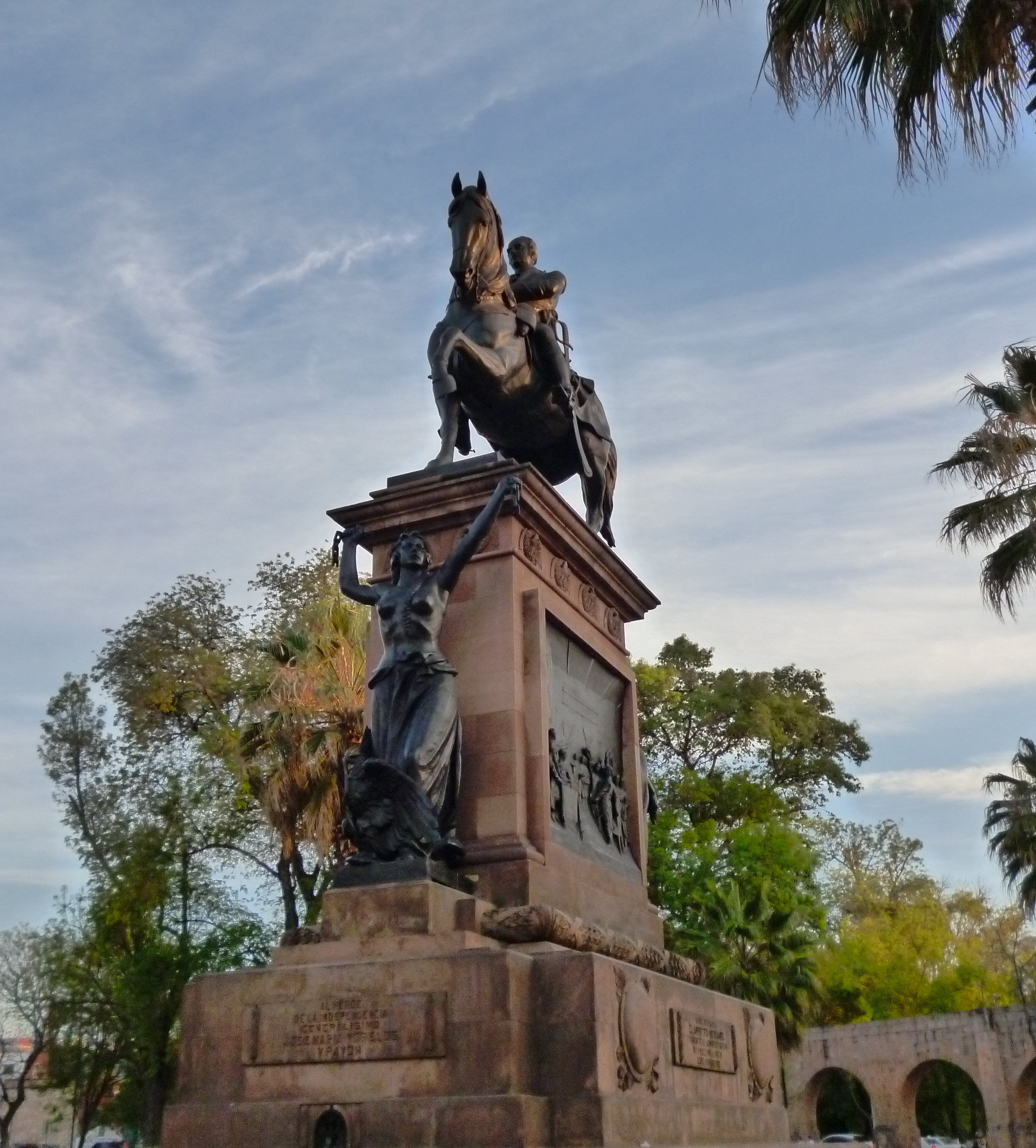
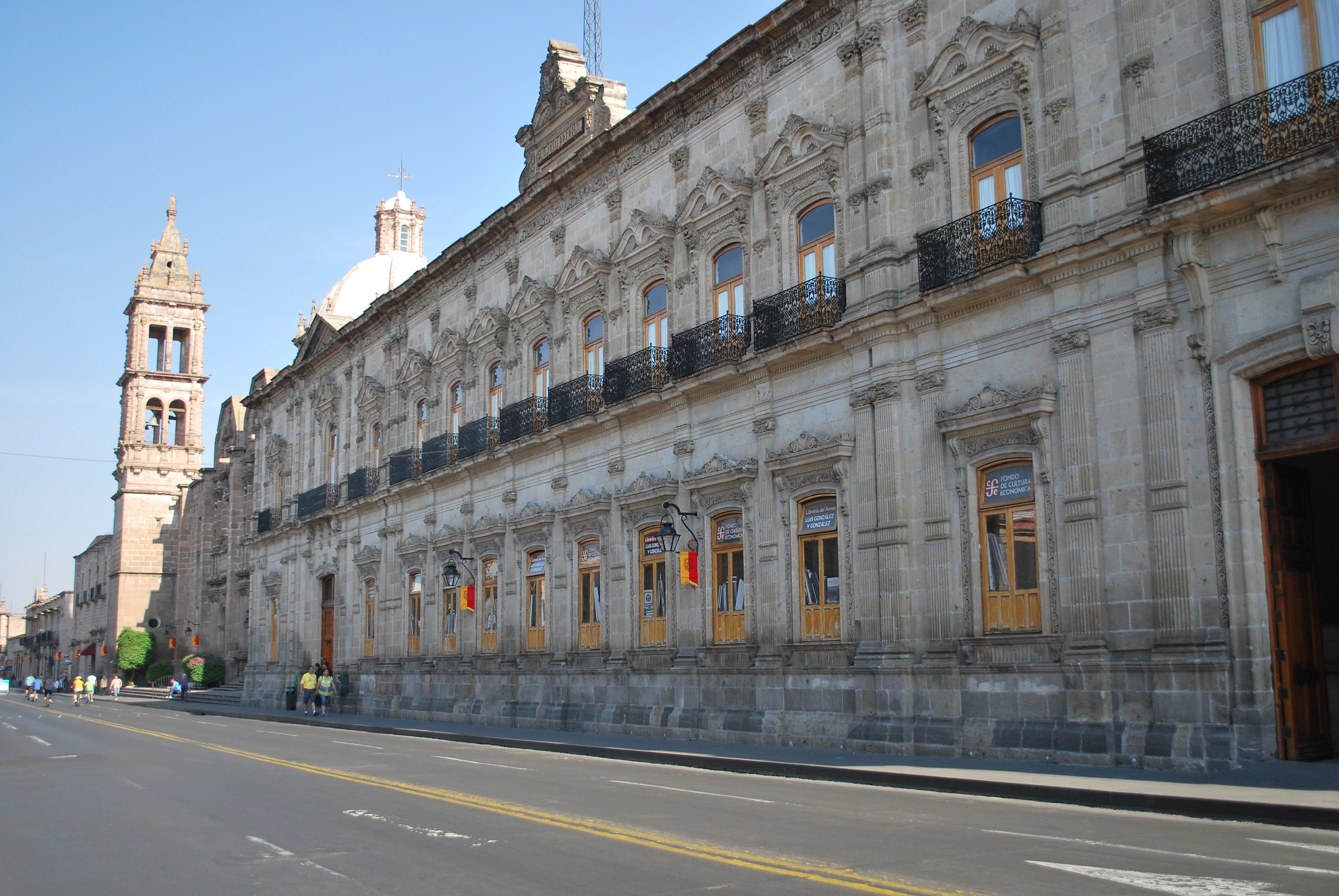
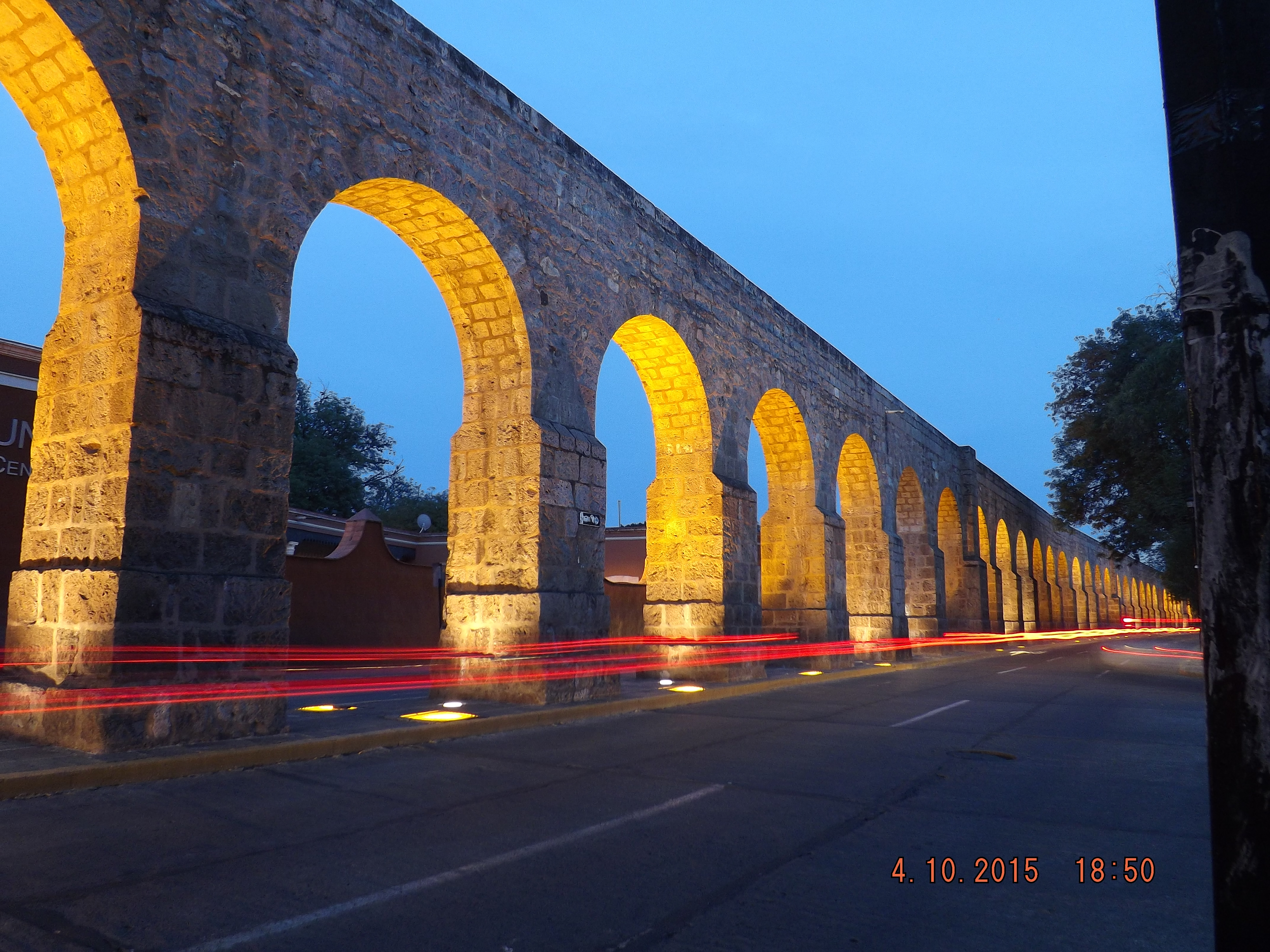
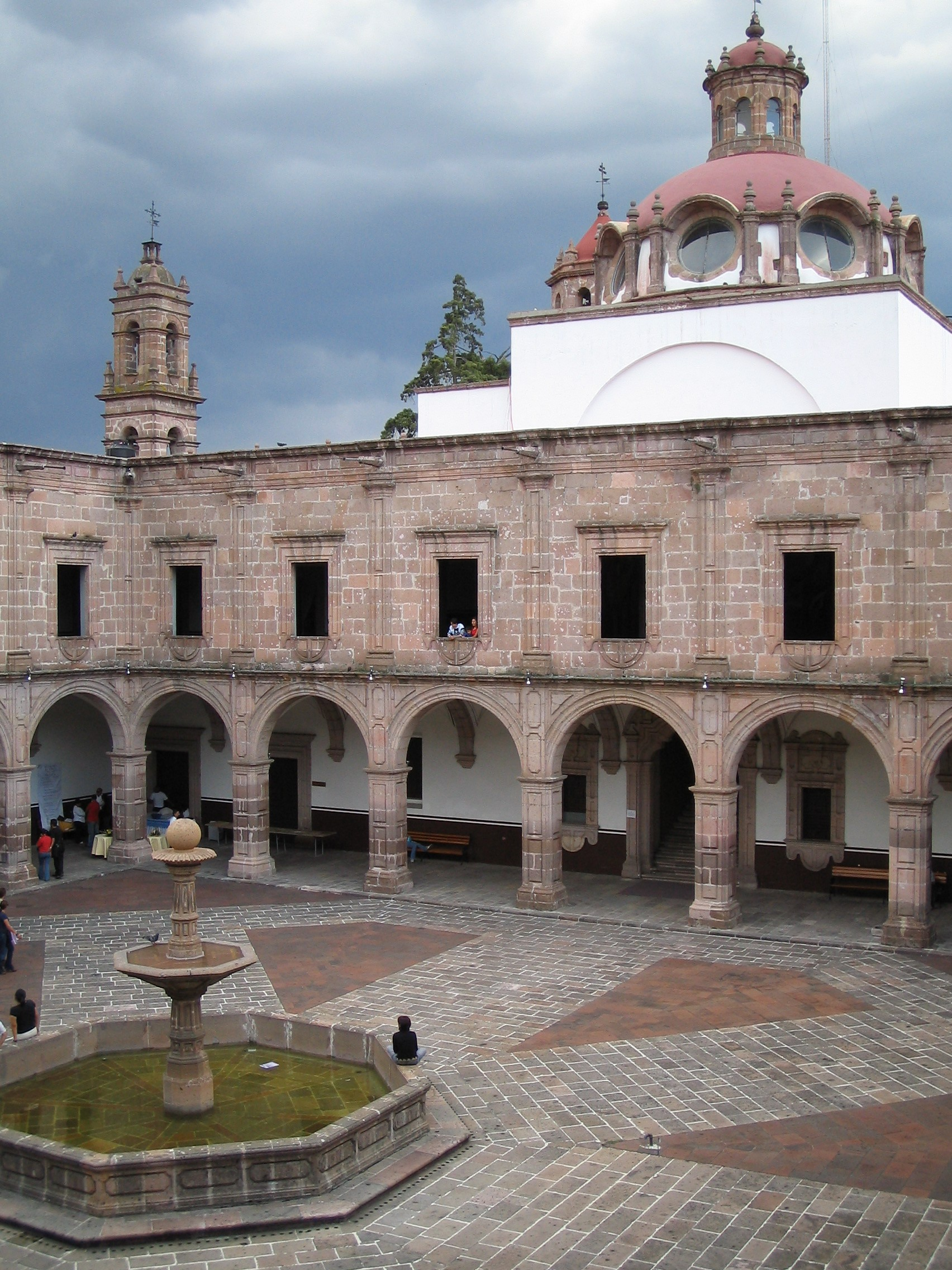
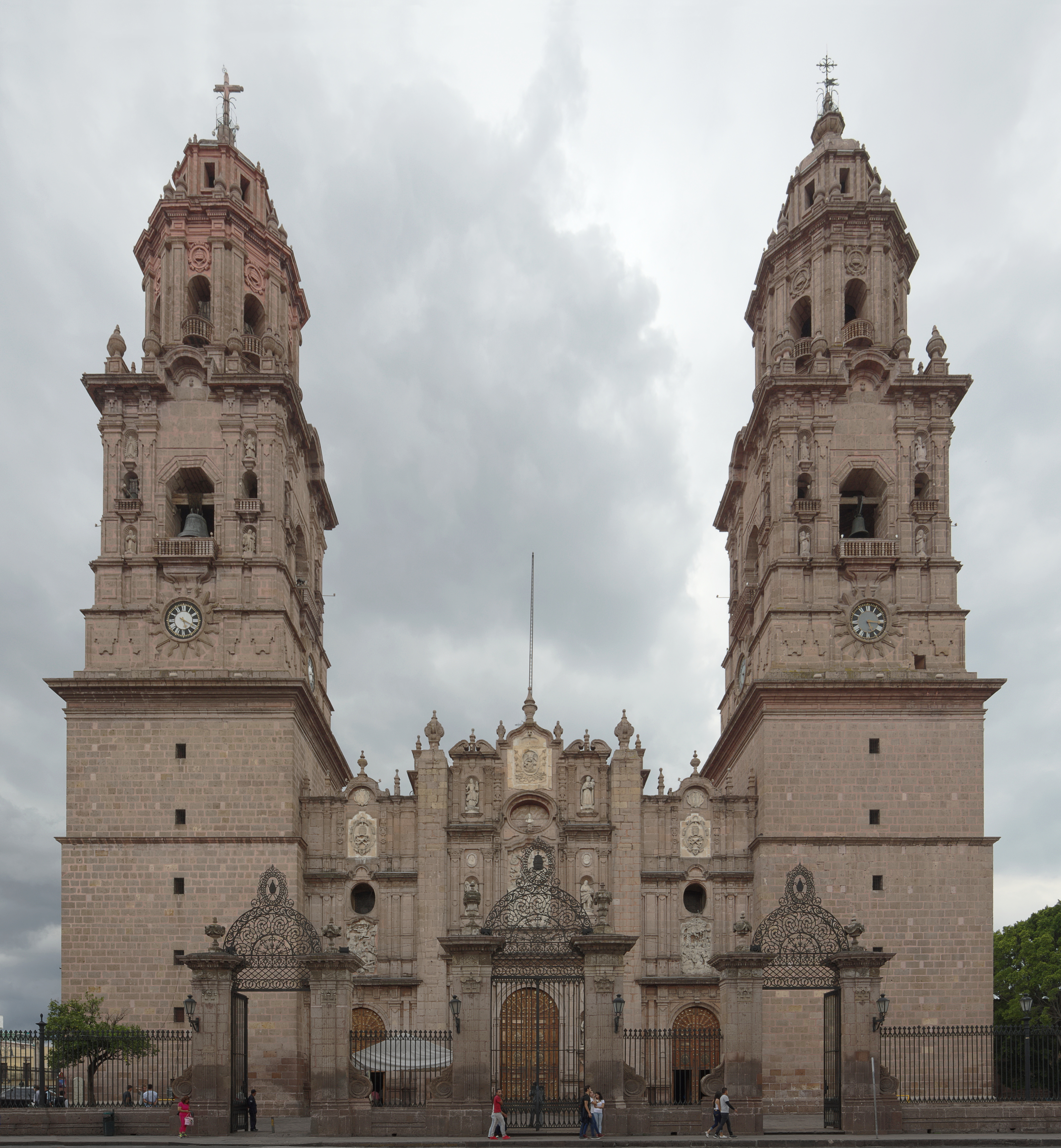
- Panoramic of Morelia College of San Nicolás Chapel of Our Lady of Guadalupe Equestrian statue of José María Morelos Michoacán Government Palace Aqueduct of Morelia Clavijero Cultural Center Cathedral of Morelia

- Flag Coat of arms

- Location within Michoacán Location within Mexico
- Coordinates: 19°46′06″N 101°11′22″W
- Country: Mexico
- State: Michoacán
- Municipality: Morelia
- Founded: 1541
- Name change Valladolid → Morelia: 1828
- Municipality Founded: 1831
- Founded by: Antonio de Mendoza
- Named after: José María Morelos

Government
  - Municipal President: Alfonso Martínez

Area
  - City: 463 sq mi (1,199 km^{2})
- Elevation: 6,300 ft (1,920 m)

Population (2021)
  - City: 797,773
  - Rank: 1st in Michoacán; 22nd in Mexico
  - Density: 1,723/sq mi (665.4/km^{2})
  - Metro: 1,060,708
  - Municipality: 849,053

GDP (PPP, constant 2015 values)
  - Year: 2023
  - Total: $18.3 billion
  - Per capita: $18,500
- Time zone: UTC−6 (CST)
- Postal code: 58000 - 58297
- Area code: 443
- Demonym: Moreliano/a
- Website: morelia.gob.mx

UNESCO World Heritage Site
- Official name: Historic Centre of Morelia
- Type: Cultural
- Criteria: ii, iv, vi
- Designated: 1991 (15th session)
- Reference no.: 585
- Region: Latin America and the Caribbean

Morelia (Spanish pronunciation: [moˈɾelja]; from 1545 to 1828 known as Valladolid; Otomi: Mänxuni) is the capital and most populous city of the Mexican state of Michoacán. Situated in the Guayangareo Valley in the north-central part of the state, it is the municipal seat of the municipality of Morelia. The main pre-Hispanic cultures here were the Purépecha and the Matlatzinca, but no major cities were founded in the valley during this time. The Spanish took control of the area in the 1520s. The Spanish under Viceroy Antonio de Mendoza founded a settlement here in 1541 with the name of Valladolid, which became rival to the nearby city of Pátzcuaro for dominance in Michoacán. In 1580, this rivalry ended in Valladolid's favor, and it became the capital of the viceregal province. After the Mexican War of Independence, the city was renamed Morelia in honor of José María Morelos, who hailed from the city. In 1991, the city was declared a UNESCO World Heritage Site for its well-preserved historical buildings and layout of the historic center. It is tradition to name people born on September 30 after the city.

The city population in 2020 was 743,275 inhabitants. The municipality had 849,053 inhabitants, and the Metropolitan Area, composed of Morelia, Tarímbaro, and Charo municipalities, had 988,704 inhabitants, according to the XIV Census.

== History ==
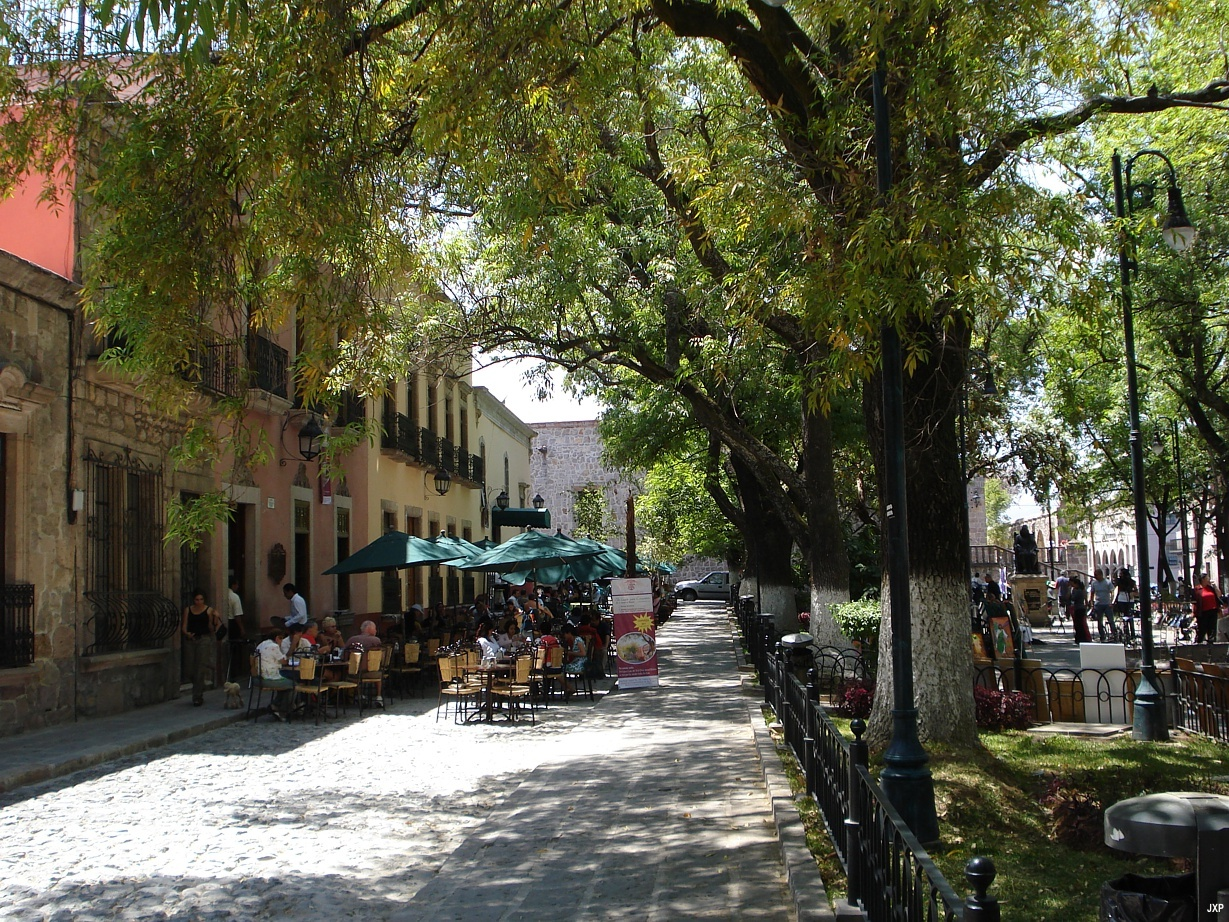
Jardin de las Rosas Garden and Park

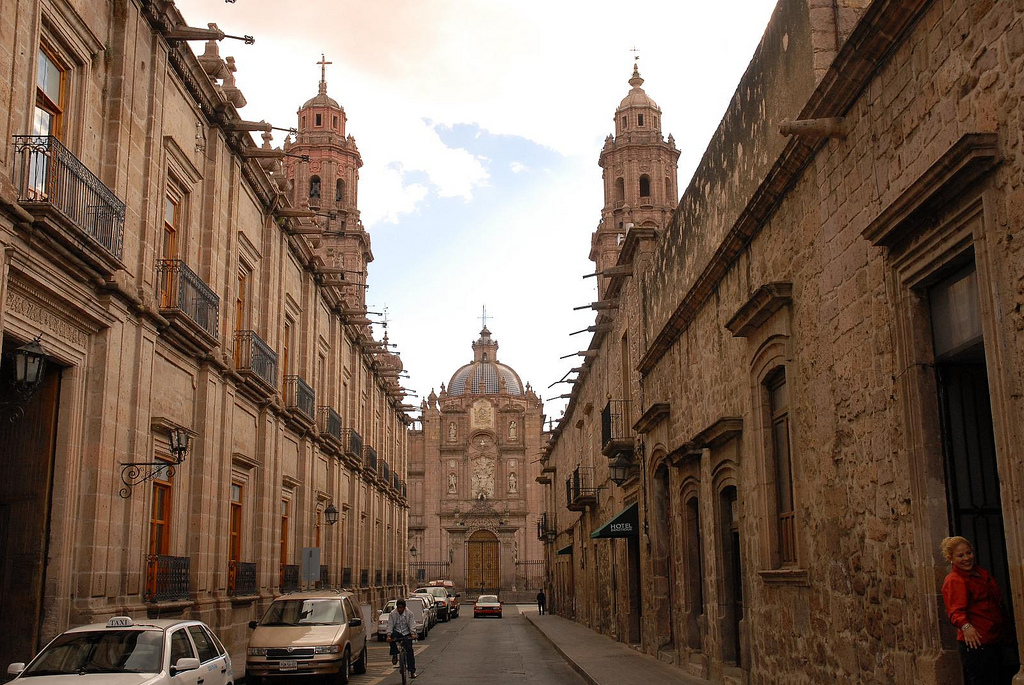
Street and Cathedral of Morelia

Human settlements in the Guayangareo Valley in which Morelia is located have been dated back as far as the 7th century. Artifacts found here have shown Teotihuacán culture influence on early cultures in this area. In the 12th century, the Purépecha arrived in the valley. They dominated it politically for the rest of the pre-Hispanic period but did not build any major settlements here. Between the 12th and the 15th centuries, Matlatzincas moved into the area with permission of the Purépechas, who were based around nearby Pátzcuaro Lake. The main Matlatzinca settlement was where Júarez Plaza in the city is today.

The Spanish pushed into the Guayangareo Valley between 1525 and 1526, headed by Gonzalo Gómez. In the 1530s, the area was evangelized by Franciscans such as Juan de San Miguel and Antonio de Lisboa.

What would become the city of Morelia was founded by Viceroy Antonio de Mendoza and a number of encomenderos in 1541, who first named it Nueva Ciudad de Michoacán (New City of Michoacán). The newly founded settlement grew quickly, prompting Vasco de Quiroga to go to Spain and procure for rival settlement Pátzcuaro the title of city and a seal, to prevent the "new city" from becoming the capital of Michoacán. The action also required that the new settlement change its name to Guayangareo. In 1545, Guayangareo gained city status from Charles V with the name of "Valladolid," after the hometown of Antonio de Mendoza. This was part of a power struggle between Antonio de Mendoza and Vasco de Quiroga over the province of Michoacán. During Quiroga's lifetime, he managed to keep political and ecclesiastical power in Pátzcuaro despite the viceroy's and encomenderos' objections. Quiroga died in 1565, however, and by 1580, both political and religious authority (Episcopal see) had been transferred to the city of Valladolid, moving the College of San Nicolás, which Vasco founded and laying the groundwork for establishing a new cathedral for the province.

The 17th century saw growth for Valladolid, with the construction of the cathedral and aqueduct. The cathedral was begun in 1660 (finished in 1744) and the aqueduct in 1657. Both of these structures would later be worked on in the 18th century by Master Architect of Valladolid, Diego Durán. During the 17th century, many of the city's large churches and monasteries were established, such as the monasteries of San Francisco, San Agustin, El Carmen, and La Merced as well as the convents of Las Rosas, Las Monjas and Capuchinas. Churches include La Compañía, San Juan, and La Cruz, but the most important structure built during this time period was the cathedral. The location of this cathedral defined the composition and development of the city from then on.

At the end of the viceregal period, Valladolid was a small city with about 20,000 inhabitants. It was also an educational center with four important schools such as the College of San Nicolás. These schools would produce scholars such as Miguel Hidalgo y Costilla and José María Morelos y Pavón, who were sympathetic to the new republican ideas coming out of post-revolution France and the United States. Demonstrations against Spanish rule had been occurring in the town in 1809, culminating in the Conspiracy of 1809. This plot was discovered, and the main conspirators were arrested and sent to other parts of New Spain, helping to spread republican ideas.

One year later, after forming his army in Guanajuato state, Hidalgo arrived and took over the city, proclaiming the end of slavery in Mexico. The city was taken back by royalist forces soon after. Morelos came here to try and dislodge the royalists but was defeated by Agustín de Iturbide. Another prominent figure in the war, Mariano Matamoros was shot by firing squad on the city's main square in 1814. The city remained in royalist's hands until 1821, Iturbide, who had switched sides, and Vicente Guerrero entered the city with the Trigarante Army.

In 1828, the newly created state of Michoacán changed the name of the city from Valladolid to Morelia, in honor of José María Morelos y Pavón. This is the official name it retains today, although its Purépecha name remains Uaianarhio and has had nicknames such as City of Pink (Cantera) Stone, the City of Open Doors, The Rose of the Winds, The Garden of New Spain and religiously as Morelia of the Sacred Heart of Jesus. The city became a municipality in 1831.

The later 19th century is marked by struggles between liberal and conservatives forces in Mexico. During the Revolution of Ayutla, the city was taken by rebel forces under Epitacio Huerta and General García Pueblita, but was taken back in 1855 by forces under Antonio López de Santa Anna. Rebels attacked Santa Anna's troops again a year later. French troops imposing imperial rule entered the city in 1863, with the republican forces moving the capital of Michoacán to Uruapan while conservative families in Morelia pledged support for emperor Maximilian I, who then visited the city. In 1867, the city was taken by republican general Nicolás de Régules and the capital of Michoacán returned to Morelia. In 1869, during a rebellion against Benito Juárez’s government, General Epitacio Huerta attacked government positions in the city but were beaten back by forces under Mariano Escobedo.

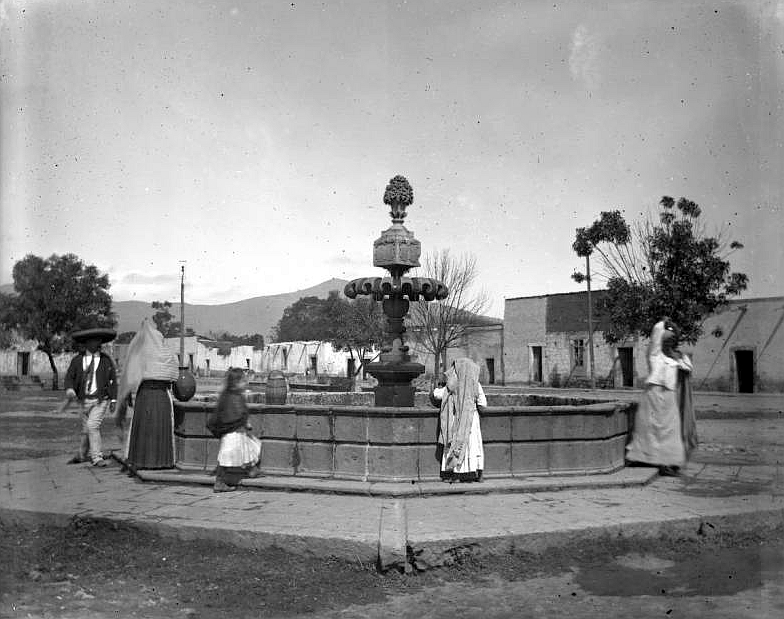
Filling water jars at a fountain in Morelia, 1906

The first factories were opened in the city between 1868 and 1870, along with the first telegraph line. The railroad followed in 1883, as well as streetcars.

In 1910, celebrations are held for the centennial of Independence but tensions are high in the city due to the shortage of grain and the continuation of President Porfirio Diaz in power. One year later, revolutionaries loyal to Francisco I. Madero are welcomed into the city. In 1914, the capital was moved from Morelia to the city of Tacámbaro. The city was then taken by forces under General Sánchez in the same year, and by forces loyal to Francisco Villa in 1915.

In 1920, the Palace of the State Government was briefly taken over by farmworkers and others from all over the state. Isaac Arriaga is assassinated here in 1921. The city is attacked again by rebels calling themselves "Delahuertistas" in 1924. The fight mostly occurs in the main plaza with the city defended by General Lopez, Garcia, and Avila Camacho.

Morelia was the location for the 1958 film The Bravados starring Gregory Peck and Joan Collins. Filming was difficult because it was unusually rainy and cold for the region.

During the 1960s the street vendors were removed from the historic center of the city, and palm trees that lined the Avenida Madero, the main east-west road, were cut down. In 1966, there was a student revolt at the state university which was put down by the army.

The 1970s and 1980s are marked by construction including the Periferico bypass ring around the city. During the 1980s, damage due to geologic faults, exacerbated by falling water tables from groundwater pumping is noticed. This problem is similar to problems faced by other cities on the Trans-Mexican Volcanic Belt such as Querétaro and Mexico City.

In 1991, the city was declared a UNESCO World Heritage Site due to its well-preserved architecture. In 2001, street vendors were moved again from the historic center to make the area more tourist-friendly. Traffic was rerouted from here as well with the construction of new bypasses. In 2006 and 2007, many of the plazas and gardens in the historic center were remodeled.

In 2008, eight people were killed in a grenade attack.

In 2009, the Morelia metropolitan area was tentatively established as consisting of the municipalities of Zinapécuaro, Álvaro Obregón, Charo, Tarímbaro and Morelia. This initial determination was made by the Secretary of Urbanism and Environment, with further refinements to be made as the municipal presidents of these entities meets to discuss limits, strategies and further actions. One of these actions has been to establish a formal commission to administer the area.

== Geography ==
=== Climate ===
Under the Köppen climate classification, Morelia has a subtropical highland climate (abbreviated Cwb on climate maps), with warm-to-hot days and cool nights year round due to its high elevation. Most precipitation falls during the summer monsoon season from June to September. Average monthly temperatures are between 14 and 22 °C (57 and 72 °F), with maximum temperatures of 38.3 °C (100.9 °F) in the summer of 1998 and the lowest temperature of −5.2 °C (22.6 °F) in January 1985.

Climate data for Morelia (1951–2010)
Month	Jan	Feb	Mar	Apr	May	Jun	Jul	Aug	Sep	Oct	Nov	Dec	Year
Record high °C (°F)	35.0 (95.0)	34.4 (93.9)	35.6 (96.1)	37.8 (100.0)	39.3 (102.7)	38.5 (101.3)	36.5 (97.7)	35.5 (95.9)	35.8 (96.4)	36.0 (96.8)	38.3 (100.9)	35.0 (95.0)	39.3 (102.7)
Mean daily maximum °C (°F)	23.8 (74.8)	25.6 (78.1)	27.9 (82.2)	30.0 (86.0)	30.6 (87.1)	28.4 (83.1)	26.1 (79.0)	26.0 (78.8)	25.5 (77.9)	25.5 (77.9)	25.3 (77.5)	24.2 (75.6)	26.6 (79.9)
Daily mean °C (°F)	14.5 (58.1)	15.8 (60.4)	18.1 (64.6)	20.3 (68.5)	21.5 (70.7)	20.9 (69.6)	19.4 (66.9)	19.4 (66.9)	19.1 (66.4)	18.0 (64.4)	16.5 (61.7)	15.0 (59.0)	18.2 (64.8)
Mean daily minimum °C (°F)	5.2 (41.4)	6.1 (43.0)	8.4 (47.1)	10.6 (51.1)	12.5 (54.5)	13.4 (56.1)	12.8 (55.0)	12.9 (55.2)	12.7 (54.9)	10.5 (50.9)	7.8 (46.0)	5.9 (42.6)	9.9 (49.8)
Record low °C (°F)	−5.2 (22.6)	−3.0 (26.6)	0.2 (32.4)	1.7 (35.1)	4.6 (40.3)	3.0 (37.4)	3.9 (39.0)	6.0 (42.8)	5.0 (41.0)	0.0 (32.0)	−1.1 (30.0)	−4.4 (24.1)	−5.2 (22.6)
Average precipitation mm (inches)	18.8 (0.74)	9.3 (0.37)	9.8 (0.39)	14.2 (0.56)	46.3 (1.82)	141.7 (5.58)	183.0 (7.20)	166.8 (6.57)	140.6 (5.54)	55.4 (2.18)	12.1 (0.48)	5.6 (0.22)	803.6 (31.64)
Average precipitation days (≥ 0.1 mm)	2.7	1.8	1.9	3.1	7.9	17.4	22.2	21.5	17.6	8.8	2.7	1.9	109.5
Average relative humidity (%)	56	52	46	43	48	62	68	69	69	66	62	59	58
Mean monthly sunshine hours	237	243	281	263	259	208	195	202	184	219	234	233	2,758
Source 1: Servicio Meteorologico Nacional (humidity 1981–2000)
Source 2: Ogimet (sun 1981–2010)

== Population ==
The city of Morelia is the most populous city in the state of Michoacán and the third most important in the Bajío Region, just behind León de Los Aldama and Querétaro City. In the most recent census carried out by Inegi in 2020 the city registered a population of 743,275 inhabitants, an increase of almost 145,000 inhabitants over the previous census carried out in 2010 when it had a population of 597,511.

== Notable sites ==
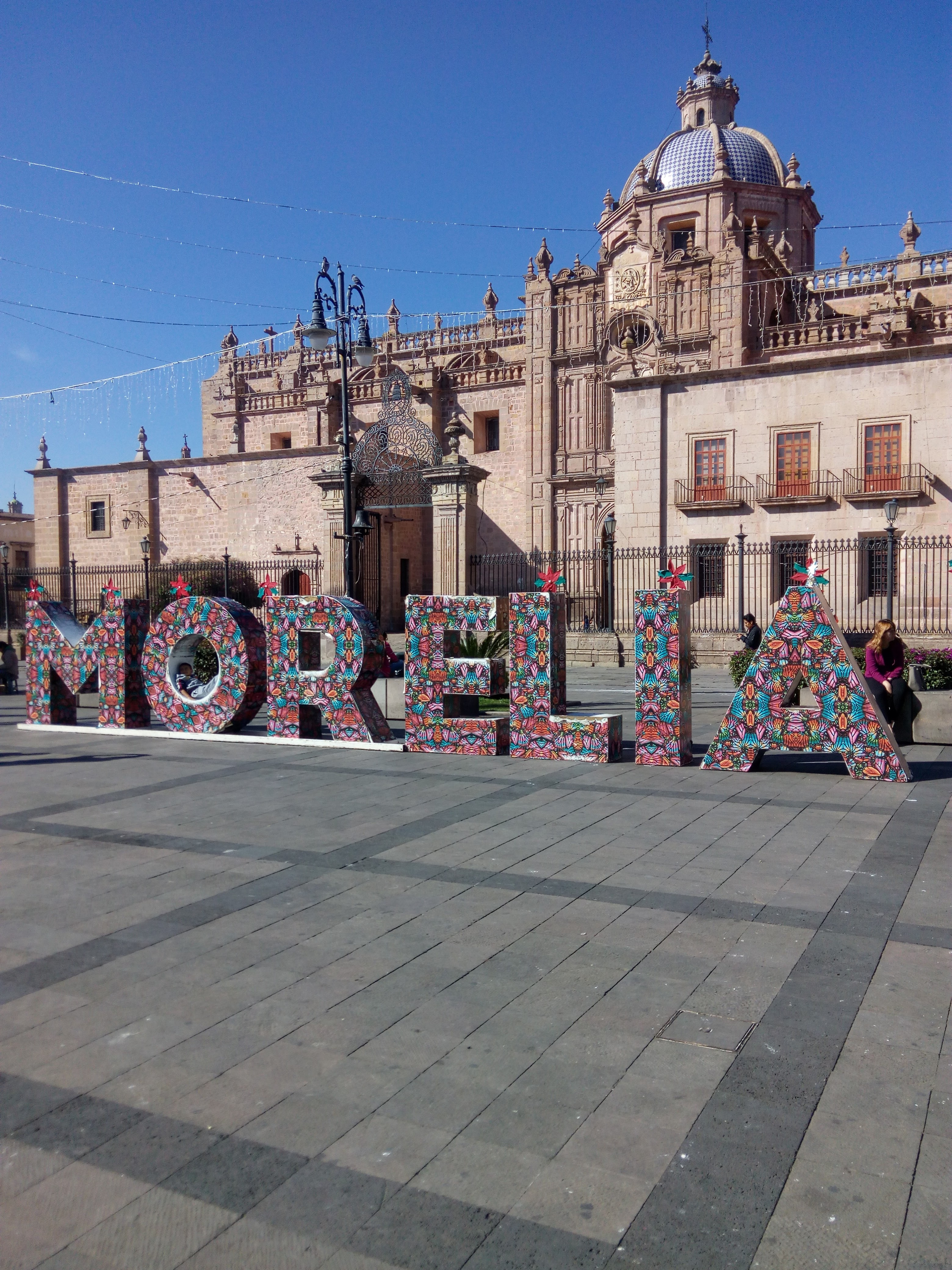
City Sign at Cathedral Plaza

Almost all of Morelia's notable sites lie in its historic center. This historic center is roughly equivalent to the original layout of the city when it was founded in 1541, and most of this layout has survived intact to the present day. Anticipating growth, this original layout had very wide streets and plazas for the time, with streets systematically arranged to allow for elongation. The streets are systematically laid out, but not rigidly squared, with most having gentle curves designed into them. Most of the grandest structures were completed during the 18th century, including the facade and bell towers of the cathedral, the Colegio Seminario (today the State Government Palace), La Alhóndiga (today part of the Palace of Justice) and numerous private mansions. During the same time period, infrastructure such as the city's aqueduct and various plaza fountains were constructed. The Mexican federal government lists 1,113 buildings built from the 16th to the 20th centuries as having historical value. The buildings encompass the various architectural styles that have been fashionable in Mexico, but nearly all are built of pink Cantera stone, which gives the city a unified appearance. Several measures were taken in the 20th century to preserve this part of the city. In 1956, the city enacted regulations to preserve the historic center's colonial buildings. In 1990, President Carlos Salinas de Gortari issued a decree making the historic center of Morelia a national historic monument. In 1991, the same area was declared a World Heritage Site by UNESCO, which covers 200 of the area's historic buildings.

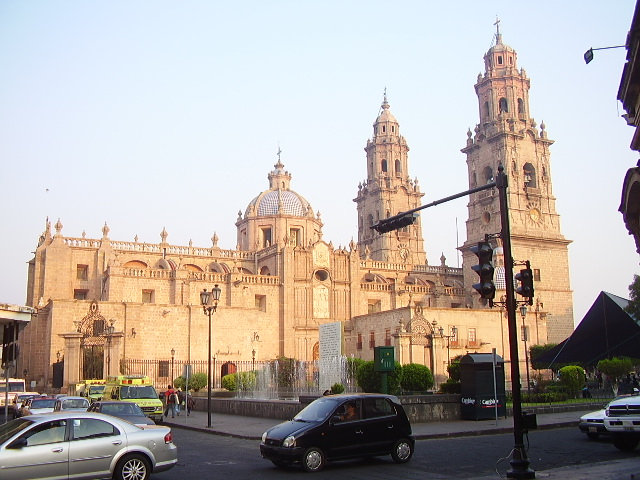
Morelia Cathedral

The heart of the historic center is the cathedral and its surrounding plazas: the Plaza de Armas, also known as the Plaza de los Mártires, the Juárez Plaza and the Melchor Ocampo Plaza. The largest plaza is the Plaza de Armas, which has been remodeled several times since it was designed in the 16th century. It has been renamed several times as well, from "de la Constitución," "de la República" to the current official name of "de los Mártires" but popularly it retains the name of "Plaza de Armas." The alternate name, Plaza de los Mártires (Plaza of the Martyrs) is in honor of people like Mariano Matamoros, Guadalupe el Salto and others who were executed here during the Mexican War of Independence and later in 1830 during political unrest. The plaza is surrounded by portals, and colonial era buildings such as the Banca Promex, the Virrey de Mendoza Hotel, the Juan de Dios Gomez House and the old town hall, also called the Michelena House. Until the late 19th century, a monument to Morelos had been here, but this was removed along with the fountain and replaced by a kiosk that was brought from London and remains to this day. The last remodeling of the plaza occurred in the mid-20th century under the direction of architect and painter Juan O'Gorman. The Melchor Ocampo Plaza was originally named "Plaza de la Paz." In the late 19th century, this plaza was remodeled and a monument to Ocampo sculpted by Primitivo Miranda was placed here. Another statue by Miranda, this one of Jose Maria Morelos y Pavon was placed in the small plaza on the west side of the cathedral and named the Morelos Plaza.

The first church on the Cathedral site was built in 1577, which was a modest structure of adobe and wood. Many years later, this structure would be almost completely destroyed by a fire. Originally, the Cathedral of Michoacán was in Pátzcuaro in a church that now is the Basilica of Nuestra Señora de la Salud. When cathedral status was moved from there to Valladolid in 1580, the city became the civil, religious, and cultural capital of the territory. In 1660, Bishop Marcos Ramírez del Prado, placed the first stone of the new cathedral, which was designed by Vicenzo Barocco. Of the major churches of the early colonial period, only this and the Mexico City Cathedral do not face west, as was customary. The Cathedral of Michoacán is also unique in that it is dedicated to the Transfiguration of Jesus, rather than some form of the Virgin Mary. The cathedral was consecrated in 1705, even though it was not yet finished. The facade as a relief of the Transfiguration of Christ and the east nave is dedicated to the sheepherders and Wise Men of the Nativity. Built of pink Cantera stone, the cathedral's two 60-meter-high (200 ft) towers still dominate the skyline of the city, and are the second tallest Baroque towers in Mexico.

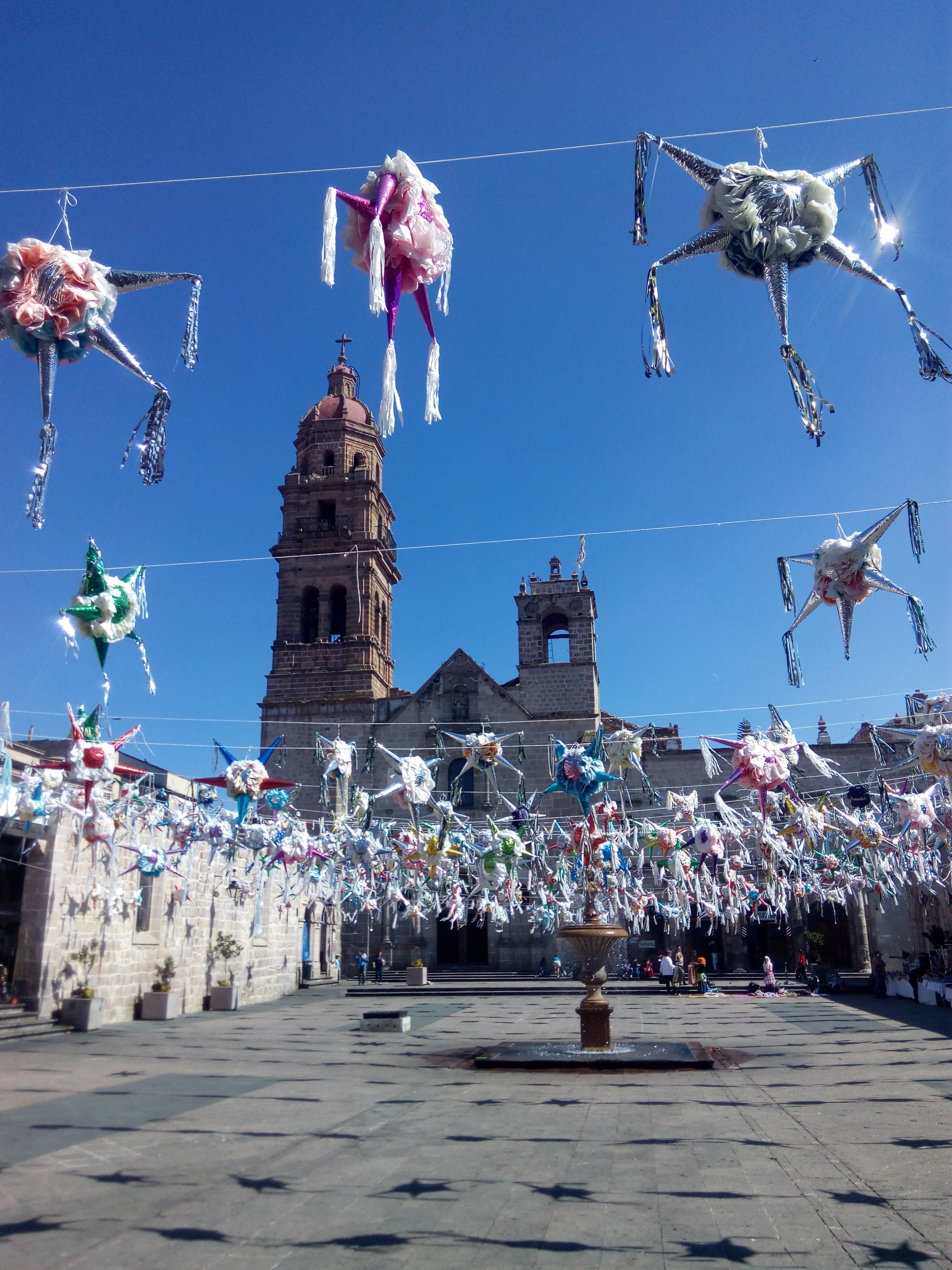
Decorated Plaza next to Cathedral in Morelia

The cathedral's official name is Cathedral of the Divine Savior of Morelia. Since it was built over the 17th and 18th centuries, elements of Neoclassical, Herreresque, and Baroque architecture can be seen in the building. The facade of the cathedral is mostly decorated in pilasters rather than columns and relieves rather than sculptures. There are more than two hundred pilasters but no columns, the only church built this way during the colonial period.

Inside, there are a number of elements that stand out. The baptismal font was made of silver in the 19th century and was used to baptize Mexico's first emperor, Agustín de Iturbide. A three-meter-tall (9.8 ft) monstrance made of pure silver adorns the main altar and is unique in that it can be disassembled and reassembled. Also on the altar is a 16th-century cornstalk paste image of the Señor de la Sacristía (Lord of the Sacristy), whose gold crown was a gift from Philip II of Spain. A newer addition is the organ from Germany, which has 4,600 pipes and is one of the largest in Latin America. On Saturdays at 8:45 pm the cathedral sponsors a sound-and-light show.

In front of the cathedral is the old Seminario Tridentino de San Pedro, one of the educational institutions of the colonial city. Today it is the Palace of the State Government. It was constructed by Thomás de Huerta in the late 18th century. The school had graduates such as José María Morelos and Melchor Ocampo. The facade is mostly original, with only the seal of Mexico having been added in the mid-19th century, when this building was converted for use as the seat of the Michoacán state government. Inside are three courtyards with the walls of the first courtyard covered in murals done by Alfredo Zalce in the 1960s.

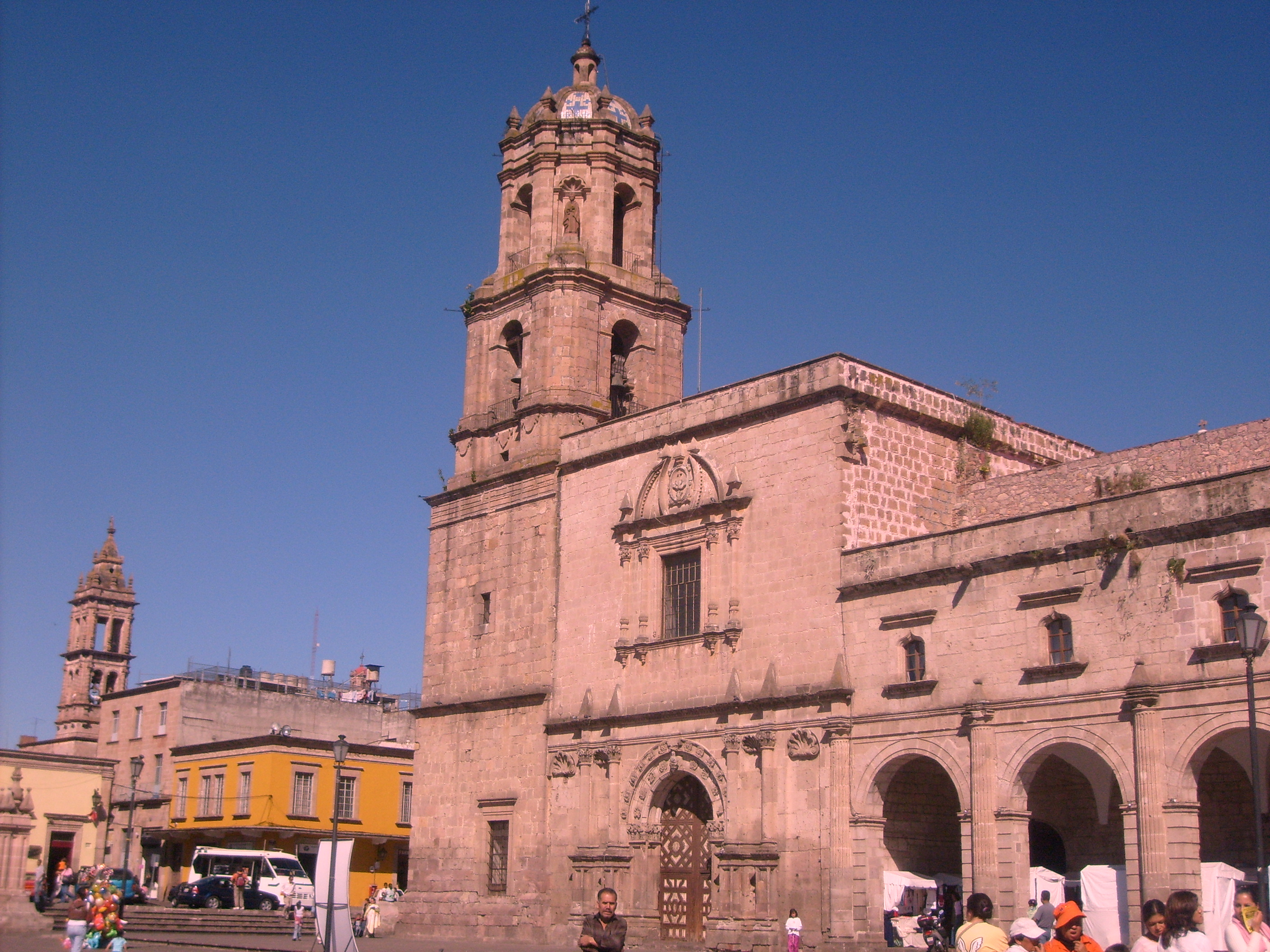
Church of San Francisco

Traslado de las Monjas in the museum of the Casa de la Cultura is also the home of the Instituto Michoacano de Cultura (Michoacan Institute of Culture) and the State Secretary of Culture. It is in the former monastery of Nuestra Señora del Carmen Descalzo, which was established in 1593. The church building was probably finished in 1619, the date inscribed on the south portal, but monastery construction continued into the 17th century. In the 19th century, the Reform Laws expropriated the cloisters and living quarters but left the church to its religious function, which continues to this day. After expropriation, the monastery area was first used as the home of the Primer Cuerpo de Caballería del Estado (First Cavalry Corps of the State). Over time the church fell into disrepair but was restored in the 1940s. The rest of the complex was restored and converted to its present function starting in 1977.

The Orquidario of Morelia is an orchid museum which houses approximately 3,400 species of the flower. The botanical garden consists of three greenhouses with some outside space. The museum is managed by SEMARNAT as part of a program to preserve wild species. The botanical garden has a surface area of over 990 square meters (10,700 ft^{2}) and was founded in 1980.

The Museo Regional Michoacano (Regional Museum of Michoacán) was founded in 1886 and its design was heavily influenced by French ideas of museum design of the time. It is housed in a building that belonged to Emperor Maximilian I, and is of ornate Baroque design. Most of the exhibits are about the history of the region with rooms dedicated to pre-Hispanic artifacts and colonial art. One noted piece is the painting called "Traslado de las Monjas" which is considered to be the finest work produced in Michoacán during the colonial period. Other important works include the original volume of the Voyage de Humboldt et Bonpland, edited in Paris in 1807 and the murals done by Alfredo Zalce, Federico Cantú and Grace Greenwood. There are also interactive exhibits on the origins of the earth and life. The museum also has conference rooms, a library, and a reading room.

The Museo del Estado (The State Museum) is dedicated to the state's past and present. It was opened in 1986 and divided into three sections – archeology, history and ethnology of the state. There is also an exhibit of the old Mier Pharmacy with its equipment from 1868. The museum is a mansion dating from the 18th century.

The Museo de Arte Colonial (Museum of Colonial Art) holds a collection of documents, old books, religious ornaments and maps from the colonial period. The museum's main attraction is its collection of more than 100 figures of Christ done in cornstalk paste. These figures were created by Indigenous artists, starting under the direction of Vasco de Quiroga, between the 16th and 19th centuries. There are also paintings done by Miguel Cabrera and José Padilla from the 18th century. The museum is in an old Baroque residence from the 18th century. Prior to the building's use as a museum, it was the site of the first official government press in the state, founded in 1821.

The Casa Museum José María Morelos y Pavón (José María Morelos y Pavón House Museum) contains a collection of items from the colonial and early independence periods of Mexico's history, including articles that belonged to Morelos himself. Morelos bought the house in 1802, but did not live there much, especially in the years just before and during the Mexican War of Independence because of his involvement with the movement. In 1933, the house was declared a national monument and in 1939 became the property of INAH to be converted into this museum. Later, the building underwent another round of restoration work and was re-inaugurated in 1991. The lower level is mostly dedicated to Morelos with the rooms on the upper level dedicated to the war in general. The museum is also the archive of the Bishopric of Michoacán and contains documents from the 16th to the 20th centuries.

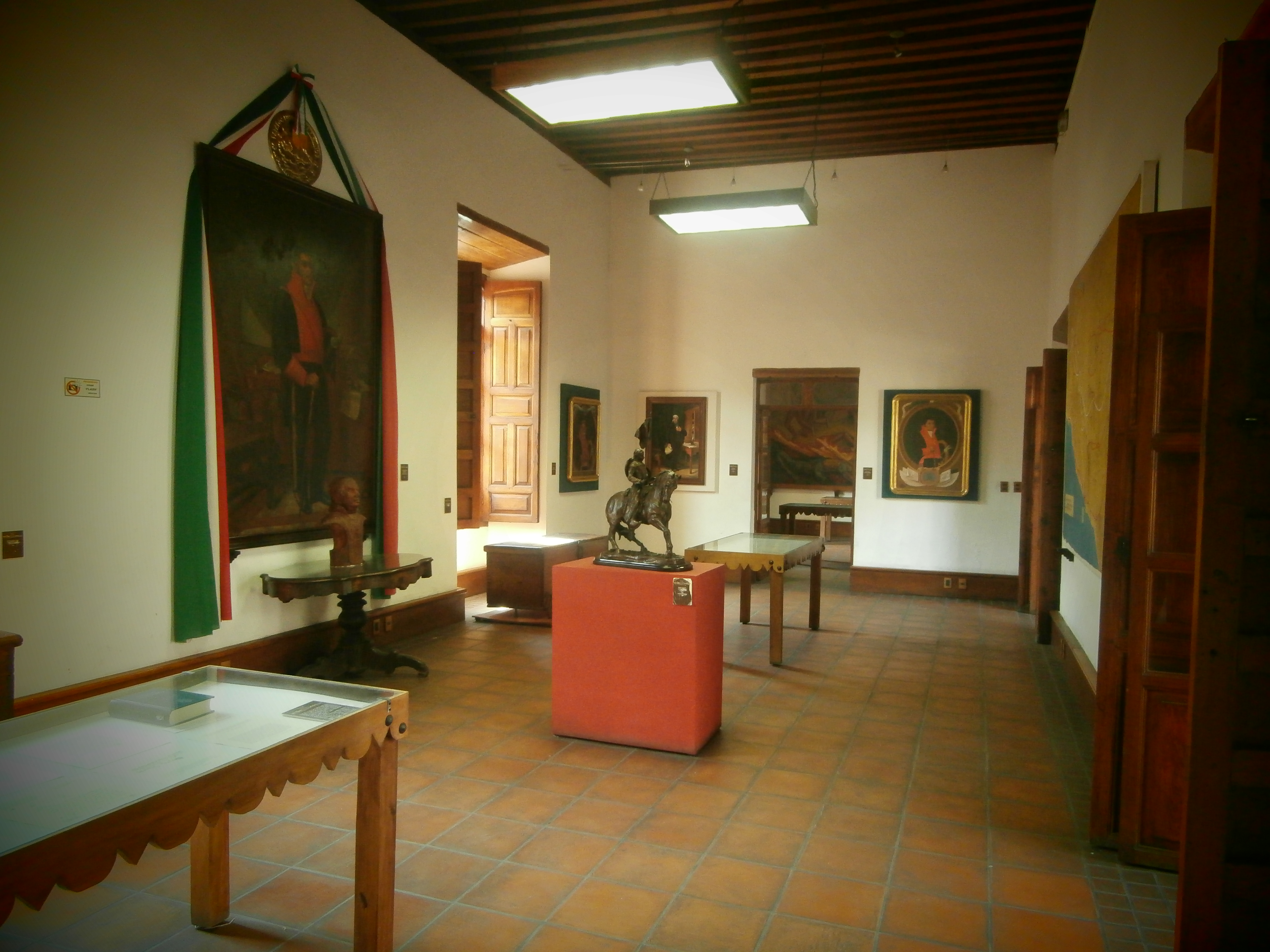
Morelos' birthplace

The Casa Natal de Morelos (Morelos' Birthplace) is the house where José María Morelos y Pavón was born in 1765. The building is a large mansion with a Neoclassic facade and a Baroque interior. In 1888, the original building was destroyed to build a farmhouse. This is the building that has been restored and turned into a museum in 1964, for the coming bicentennial of Morelos' birth. The museum contains documents and belongings of Morelos including ones he signed, money he had coined, paintings and a large library.

The Museo de la Máscara (Mask Museum) presents two different mask collections, totaling more than 165 examples from cultures in twenty Mexican states. It is located in the Casa de Artesanias de Morelia (Handcraft House of Morelia).

The Museo de Arte Contemporáneo Alfredo Zalce (Alfredo Zalce Museum of Contemporary Art) mostly contains works done by Alfredo Zalce and Efraín Vargas, both renowned Michoacán painters. It also holds temporary exhibits by Mexican and international artists.

The Plaza Monumental de Morelia was established in 1951, which was destined exclusively for bullfights. Nowadays, the ring also hosts concerts, lucha libre, and weddings.

The city's aqueduct was first documented in 1549. It was used to transport fresh water to the required destination so that the inhabitants of the city could access it. The water system was made of used wood from canoes in the area to create the base structure during its construction. As years passed with the use of the aqueduct constantly changing, there was an incident that occurred in 1784. The incident was that part of the Morelia aqueduct foundation collapsed, leaving hundreds without access to the water. On October 21, 1785, a document detailed the reconstruction of the aqueduct, and a man named Fray Antonio de San Miguel volunteered to make a plan for the reconstruction of the structure. With Fray Antonio's plans, they completely reconstructed the arches and added fixtures to repair the previous damage. As the repairs were completed the aqueduct remained in use until it stopped functioning in 1910; it remains standing to this day. The whole Aqueduct structure consisted of 253 arches (some of which have collapsed over the years), at a height of 700 meters (2,300 ft).

In front of the Aqueduct is the Fuente de las Tarascas, one of the most popular fountains in the city. The current version was installed in 1984.

== Notable people ==
- Alma Graciela Haro Cabello (born 1927), singer known as Esmeralda
- Agustín de Iturbide, Mexican army general and politician, 1st emperor of Mexico
- Felipe Calderón, president of Mexico from 2006-2012
- Pascual Ortiz Rubio (1877-1963), president of Mexico from 1930-1932
- Junior Félix Madrigal (born 1982), Mexican footballer
- José Manuel Ponce, Mexican race car driver
- Josefa Ortiz de Domínguez, important Mexican insurgent in Mexican independence
- José María Morelos, important Mexican insurgent, Key in the Mexican Independence

== Festivals ==
The Festival Internacional de Música de Morelia is an annual event that was begun in 1988 by Bernal Jiménez, who had the dream of making Morelia the "Salzburg of Americas". The festival consists of more than forty concerts with over 500 artists participating. It has become the largest music festival in Morelia, with private and government sponsors, esp. CONACULTA. Concerts include those by chamber orchestras, choirs, ensambles, trios and soloists such as pianist Joanna MacGregor and the Britten Symphony. Each year, a different country is the "special guest," which in 2009 was the United Kingdom. In that year, some of the participants included the London Symphony Orchestra, the Brodsky Quartet, La Britten Symphony Orchestra, the Coro Nova Schola Gregoriana Di Verona of Italy, and violinist Tanya Anisimova from Russia. Participants from Mexico included the National Symphonic Orchestra, the Orquesta Sinfónica de Minería and flautist Horacio Franco.

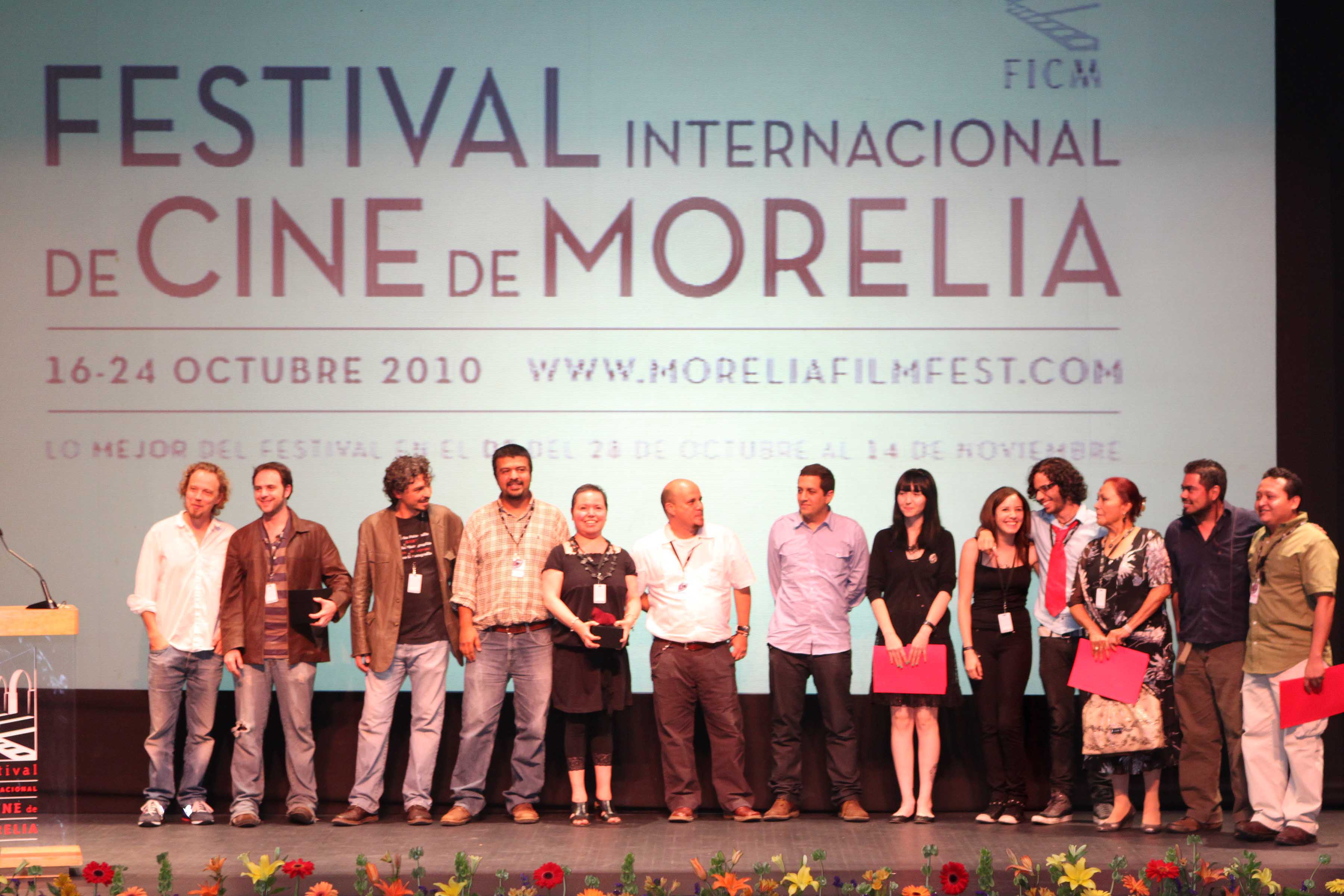
Winners speech at the 2010 Morelia Film Fest

The Festival Internacional de Cine de Morelia was begun in 2003, and is mostly dedicated to Mexican cinema, showcasing up-and-coming directors and productions. The majority of activities take place in the Cinépolis Morelia Centro, but also includes other theaters, auditoriums and public plazas.

Morelia is the site of the annual Zapata Vive Morelia Festival, which celebrates the life of Emiliano Zapata with cultural and political activities. The purpose of the event is to promote exhibitions by artistic, cultural and social organizations from the state of Michoacán and other parts of the country. Events are spread out over several days and include ones such as concerts, round tables and information sessions. The event encourages those organizations who work with the lower social classes and are politically left to participate.

The Festival de Escala is an annual event dedicated to promoting rock climbing in the municipality at places such as El Paredón de la Noria, just south of the city proper.

A popular festival that features a 3-day Salsa competition in the heart of Morelia is called "SalsaMich". Typically held in March, the festival brings Salsa dancers from all across the country to Morelia to compete for prizes.

== Sister cities ==
Morelia has a sister city relationship with Yakima, Washington, supported since 1999 by the Yakima-Morelia Sister City Association. Cultural exchanges between the cities have included musicians from Morelia who have performed with the Yakima Symphony Orchestra.

Morelia has other sister cities around the world, including: Arequipa in Peru; Caspueñas, Valladolid, (Note: Morelia had been named Valladolid before Mexican independence in 1820; it was renamed in 1828 after the independence leader José María Morelos, born in the city in 1765.) and Madrigal de las Altas Torres in Spain; Gettysburg, Kansas City, Fullerton, Monterey Park, Norwalk, and Shreveport in the United States; Matanzas and Havana in Cuba; and Sopó in Colombia.

== Education ==
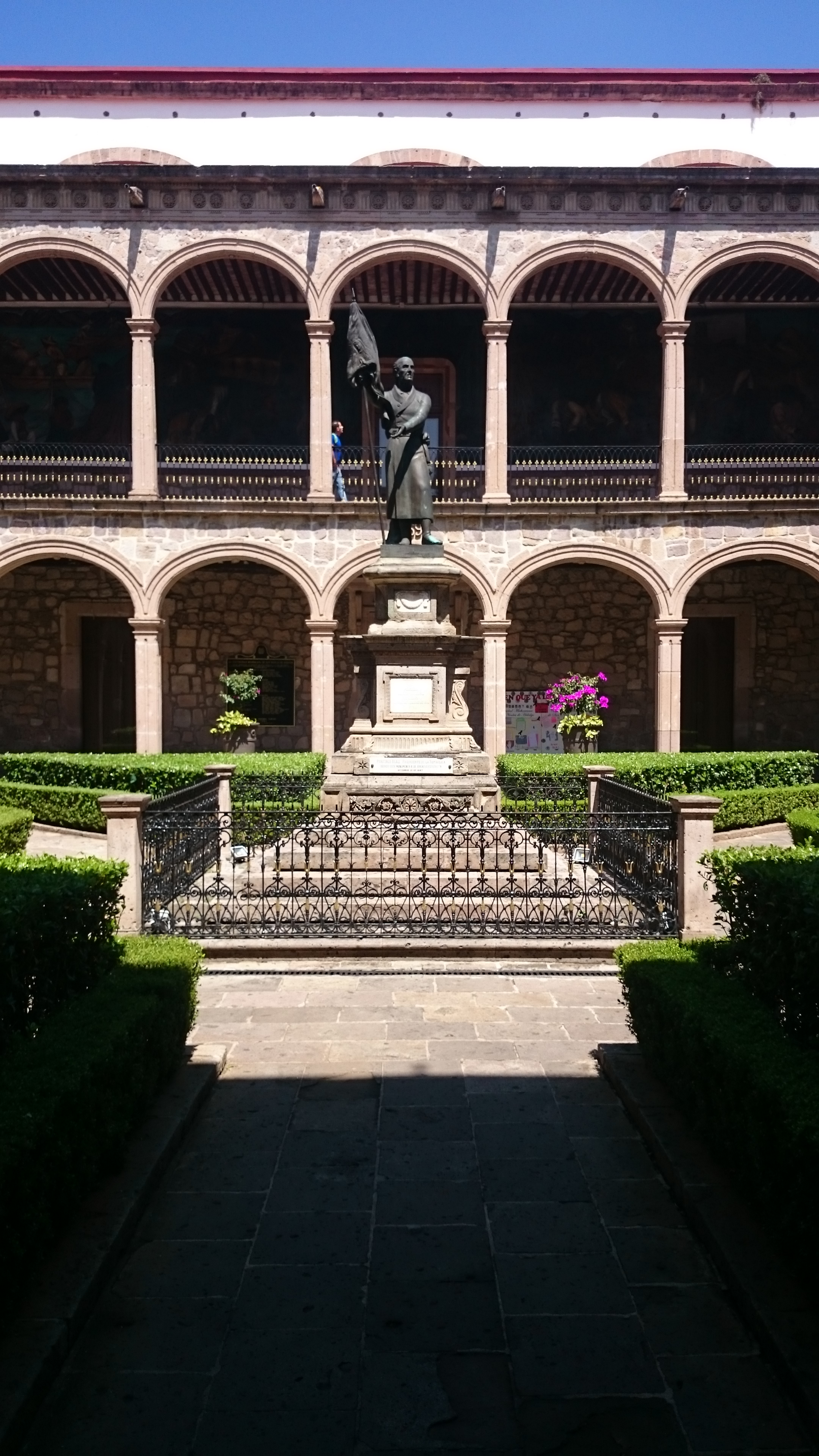
Colegio de San Nicolas

During the colonial period the city had four major educational institutions, the Colegio Seminario Tridentino, the Colegio de San Nicolás, the Colegio de los Jesuitas and the Colegio de las Rosas. The state university, the Universidad Michoacana de San Nicolás de Hidalgo, is the oldest university in the Americas, which has its origins in the college founded in 1540 by Vasco de Quiroga in Pátzcuaro, the Colegio de San Nicolás Obispo. This school was founded to train priests and missionaries for work in Michoacán. The school gained a royal seal and patronage in 1543. In 1566, colonial religious authorities took over the school and in 1574, academics here were under the jurisdiction of the Jesuits. With the episcopal seat changed to Valladolid, the school moved also in 1580 and was fused with the already existing Colegio de San Miguel Guayangareo. The school was reformed in the 17th century and its curriculum was redesigned in the 18th to include courses in philosophy, religious law, civil law and other subjects. At the beginning the 19th century, the school became one of New Spain's main centers of learning and academia, producing scholars such as a Miguel Hidalgo y Costilla, José Ma. Morelos, José Sixto Verduzco, José María Izazaga and Ignacio López Rayón, most of whom would have a role in the upcoming Mexican War of Independence. The school closed during the war but was reopened in 1847 with the name Primitivo y Nacional Colegio de San Nicolás de Hidalgo, focusing more on secular studies such as chemistry, physics, mathematics, biology, etc. based on the European university model.

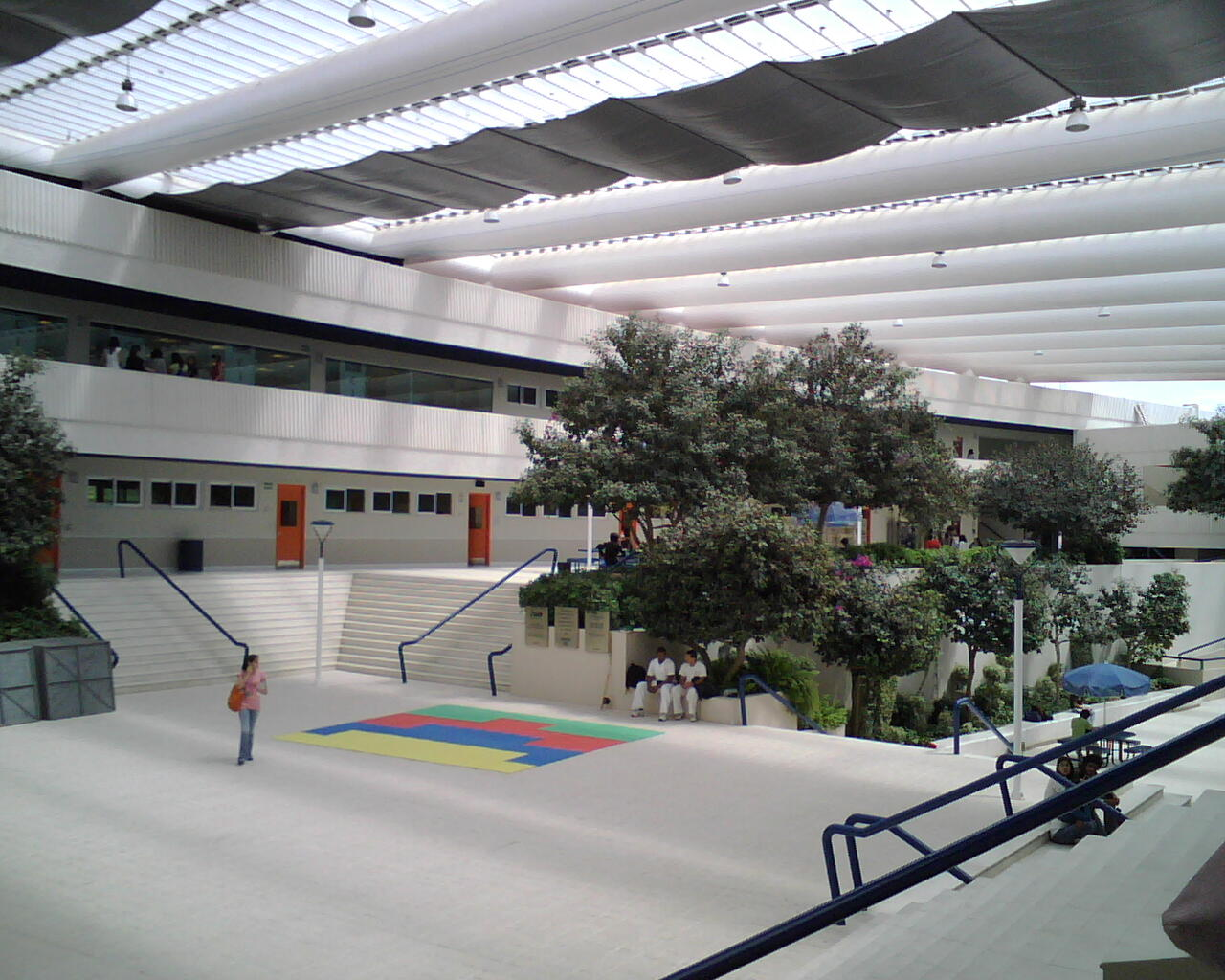
ITESM Morelia Campus

After the Mexican Revolution, the school was reorganized and renamed again to the Universidad Michoacana de San Nicolás de Hidalgo in 1917, which consolidated a number of other schools and disciplines into the new organization.

Nowadays, the Universidad Michoacana de San Nicolás de Hidalgo is the most important university in the state of Michoacán. It has been rated also as one of the Top 10 best public universities in Mexico. The university has recently expanded to other smaller cities in the state other than Morelia, such as Uruapan, Apatzingán, Ciudad Hidalgo, Lázaro Cárdenas, Coalcoman, Huetamo, Tangancicuaro and Zitacuaro. In 2011, according to the INEGI census, the university had 55,546 regular students.

Other universities in the city include Instituto Tecnológico de Morelia (ITM), Universidad Tecnológica de Morelia (UTM), Instituto Michoacano de Ciencias de la Educación, Centro de Investigación y Desarrollo del Estado de Michoacán (CIDEM), the Morelia Campus of the National Autonomous University of Mexico, Instituto de Estudios Superiores de la Comunicación (IESCAC), Universidad Pedagógica Nacional, Conservatorio de las Rosas, Universidad Vasco de Quiroga, Universidad Latina de America, Universidad La Salle Morelia, Instituto Tecnológico y de Estudios Superiores de Monterrey- Campus Morelia ITESM, Universidad Sor Juana Inés de la Cruz and many other different private universities.

== Sports ==
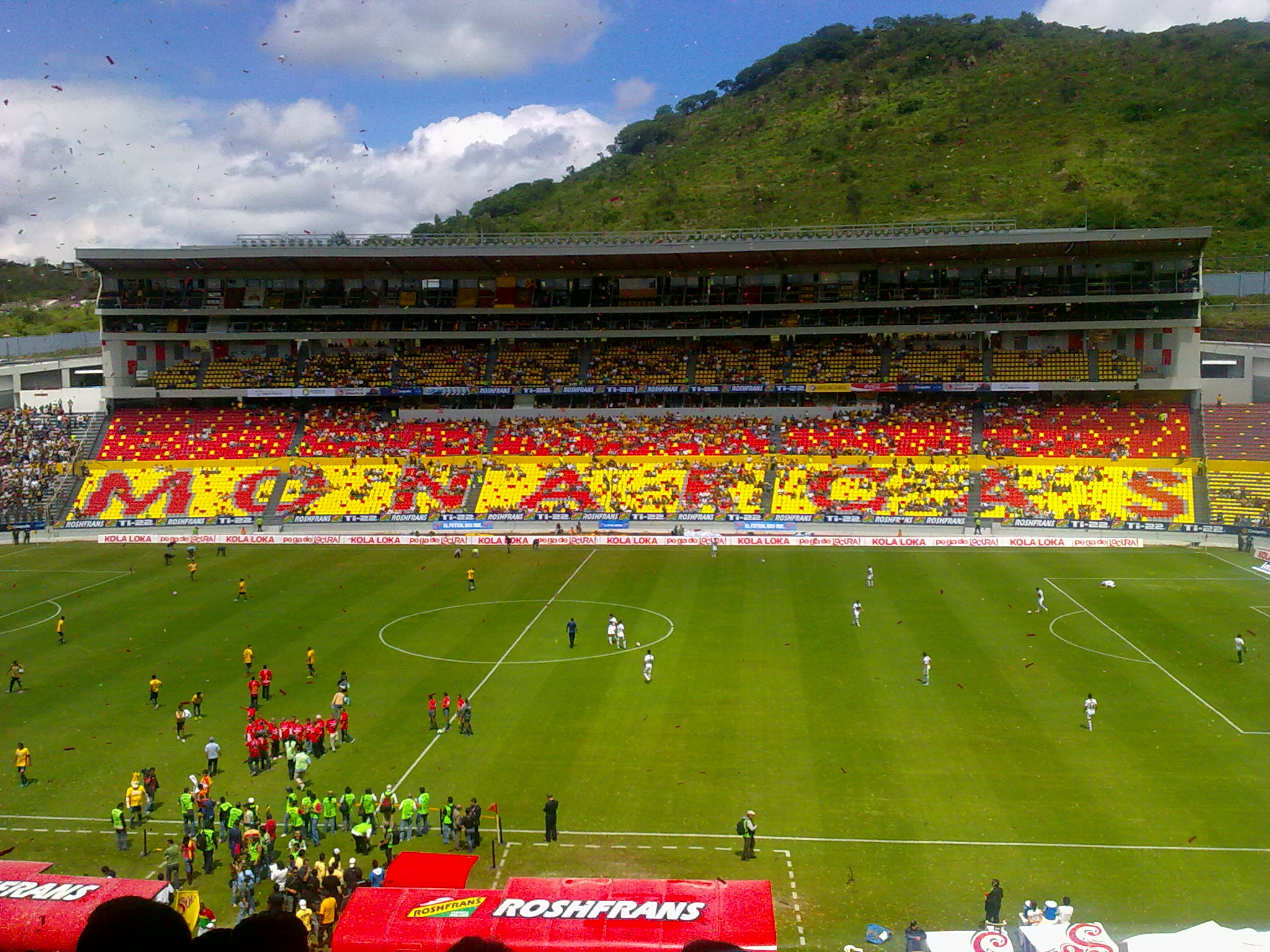
Morelos Stadium

Morelia was represented by their soccer team, Monarcas Morelia, in the Liga MX. Monarcas Morelia was founded in 1950 on a field outside the city where a monument to Lázaro Cárdenas is now located. The team's original name was Club Deportivo Morelia and was owned by Eucuario Gómez. The club's colors are the city's flag colors red and yellow because Morelia is known to be the most Spanish city in Mexico. The club was nicknamed "Amarillo" (Yellow) during the 1956–57 season, when the club won the right to play in the 1st division in which they played in their first tournament for the Copa México against Club América.

The club descended into the 2nd division again in 1968 and experienced tough times during the early 70s. By the end of the 1973–74 season the team was completely restructured by 32 Morelia Businessmen who acquired the team. After 13 years in the 2nd division, the team finally returned to 1st division play in 1981 and by the mid-1980s was competitive and reaching the Liguilla (playoffs) regularly.

Following many years of playing at Estadio Venustiano Carranza, the completion of Estadio Morelos in 1989 gave the team a new home. In 1996, the team was acquired by TV Azteca and the name Monarcas (Monarchs) Morelia was adopted in 1999 because of the three Spanish Monarchs shown in the flag of Morelia. The team won its first championship during the Invierno 2000 season and by mid-decade, was playing in international competition such as the Copa Libertadores and the Liga de Campeones de la CONCACAF (CONCACAF Champions League). The team's latest success came during the 2010 North American SuperLiga tournament, which Monarcas won over the New England Revolution on September the 1st, 2010, at New England.

The team closed the Apertura 2010 tournament of the Primera División de México (Mexico's 1st division), failing to make the "liguilla".

In 2020 it was announced that the franchise would be moving to the city of Mazatlán, Sinaloa, and would be Renamed Mazatlán F.C. Soon after, the municipal government announced that they would have a new team playing in the Liga de Expansión MX (Mexico's second division) under the name Atlético Morelia

== Transportation ==
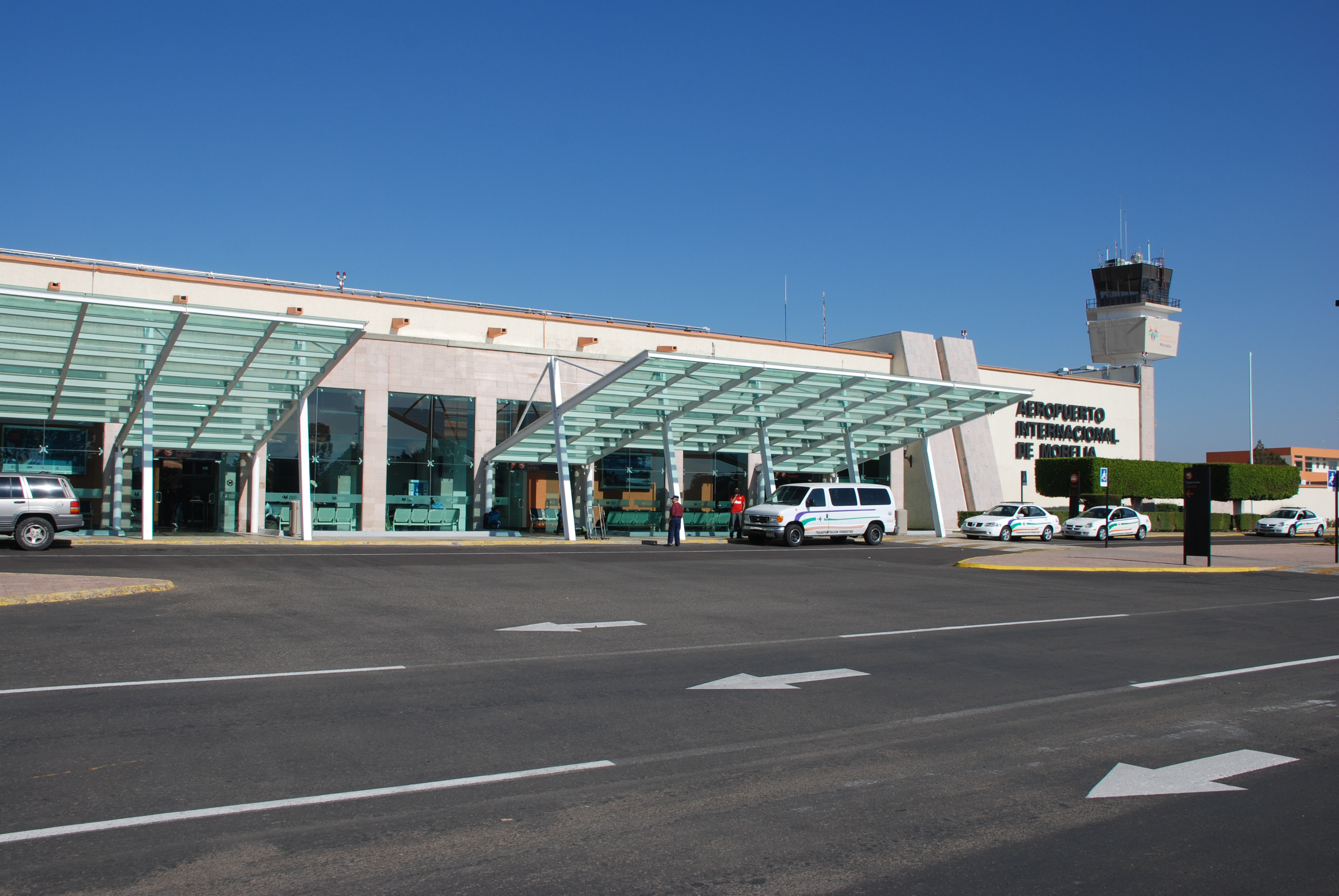
Airport of Morelia

Morelia is three or four hours from Mexico City via the Atlacomulco-Maravatío-Morelia highway and is connected by highways to the states of Mexico, Querétaro, Guanajuato and Jalisco. It is connected to the Michoacán coast via highway 200 that passes through Uruapan to the port of Lázaro Cárdenas. General Francisco Mujica International Airport or Morelia International Airport (IATA: MLM, ICAO: MMMM) is an international airport at Morelia, Michoacán, Mexico. The airport handles both domestic and international flights, with connections to Mexico City, Uruapan, Lázaro Cárdenas, Acapulco, Zihuatanejo, Guadalajara, Monterrey, Tijuana and several destinations in the United States. The airport is named after a former governor of the state of Michoacán.

== The municipality ==
As the municipal seat, Morelia is the governing authority of 423 other communities, almost all of which are small communities of between three and 1,000 people, with 89% of the municipality's population of 684,145 people within the city itself. The municipality covers a territory of 1,199.02 square kilometres (462.94 sq mi) and borders the municipalities of Tarímbaro, Chucándiro, Huaniqueo, Charo, Tzitzio, Villa Madero, Acuitzio, Lagunillas, Coeneo, Tzintzuntzan and Quiroga.

Much of the municipality is in the Guayangareo Valley between two rivers: the El Grande and the El Chiquito. Guayangareo means "large hill with a flat side." The municipality's territory is rugged and dominated by peaks such as Punhuato, El Zapote and the Otzumatlán mountain range, with the highest peak being Quinceo with an elevation of 2,787 metres (9,144 ft). The municipality belongs to the Lerma-Santiago river hydraulic region, with the main rivers being the El Grande and the El Chiquito. There are a number of streams including the Zarza and Pitaya. The most important dam here is Cointzio, with other smaller ones being Umécuaro, Laja Caliente and La Mintzita.

Vegetation outside the city varies based on elevation and the type of soil. Mountainous areas are mostly covered in conifers while lower and drier areas have trees such as mesquite. To the south of the city is the Lázaro Cárdenas Forest, which is an ecological reserve. Animal life mostly consists of small mammals, with coyotes being the largest, birds of prey and some reptiles.

The growth of the city of Morelia is having a negative impact on the surrounding forested area. This is particularly problematic in the area north of the city, which belongs to the Lake Cuitzeo basin, and is a main recharge area for the city's aquifer. The forested areas around the city are also important for the city's air quality and as a breeding place for pollinating insects needed for agriculture. UNAM has been documenting the species in these forests with the aim of getting them declared as biological reserves.

One industrial area is the Ciudad Industrial de Morelia, which mostly houses small and medium-sized enterprises. Some of the products manufactured here include cooking oil, flour, cement, plastics, bottling and candies. Tourism is a rising component of the economy, taking advantage of area's colonial heritage, smaller traditional communities, natural areas and archeological zones such as Santa María de Guido in the city, Barranca de los Lobos in Teremendo, Nahuatl Sanctuary and Catrina in Capula. However, it has not been developed sufficiently to be a major contributor. Tourism accounts for the main economic activity in Morelia. Unfortunately, due to Mexico's rising crime in drug trafficking within the cartels, this can provide a grave disincentive in the tourism sector for Morelia.

According to Standard & Poor's report for November 2009, the government of Morelia maintains an adequate development budget, backed by relatively high income and low debt. It is rated on a national scale for Mexico as A+. The economy is projected to be stable with the government keeping control of expenses.

== See also ==
- Symbols of Morelia
