= One Car Too Far =

American reality television series

- Genre: Adventure; Reality
- Starring: Gary Humphrey; Bill Wu
- Country of origin: United States
- Original language: English
- No. of episodes: 5

Production
- Production location: Chile
- Running time: Approx. 42 minutes

Original release
- Network: Discovery Channel
- Release: August 19 – September 16, 2012

One Car Too Far is an American reality television series. It stars Gary Humphrey and Bill Wu. It premiered on Discovery Channel on August 19, 2012.

== Content ==
Lasting for five episodes, One Car Too Far is a miniseries in which former United Kingdom Special Forces soldier Gary Humphrey and California-based automotive enthusiast Bill Wu attempt to survive various climates using only the parts of an automobile.

== Critical reception ==
Allison Keene of the Hollywood Reporter gave the show a mixed review, saying that its "reason for existence may be without explanation" but that "its general theme of 'how to use all of a car’s parts to survive' is engaging enough".

== Episodes ==
No.	Title	Original release date
1	"Rainforest"	August 19, 2012
Dropped deep into a hostile rainforest, Bill and Gary's teamwork and survival skills are put to the ultimate test. In just three days, their journey pits them against swollen gullies, swampy bogs, and a waist deep drive across a deadly river.
2	"Volcano"	August 26, 2012
Dropped onto the peak of a frozen volcano, Bill and Gary must navigate their car over deadly crevasses, fatal ice fields, and through razor sharp lava slopes - all the while protecting themselves and the car from freezing temperatures.
3	"Mountain"	September 2, 2012
Stranded in an unforgiving mountain range, Bill and Gary have to drive their car across boulder fields, where the threat of landslides looms. Forced to rappel off a 60-degree cliff they must now overcome a 600ft drop where one slip could be their last.
4	"Desert"	September 9, 2012
Helicoptered into the world's driest desert, Bill and Gary scale 10-story high sand dunes and 50-degree slopped sand bowls. Gary, under constant pressure, explores techniques to stay hydrated, while Bill struggles to keep their car and challenge alive.
5	"Under the Hood"	September 16, 2012
Gary Humphrey and Bill Wu take us behind the scenes of their off-road adventures. With exclusive interviews and never before seen footage, Bill and Gary give us their top ten tips for driving and surviving off road.
