= Morelia Cathedral =

Coordinates: 19.7028°N 101.192°W

Morelia Metropolitan Cathedral
- Cathedral of the Transfiguration of the Lord of Morelia
- Catedral de la Transfiguración del Señor de Morelia (Spanish)
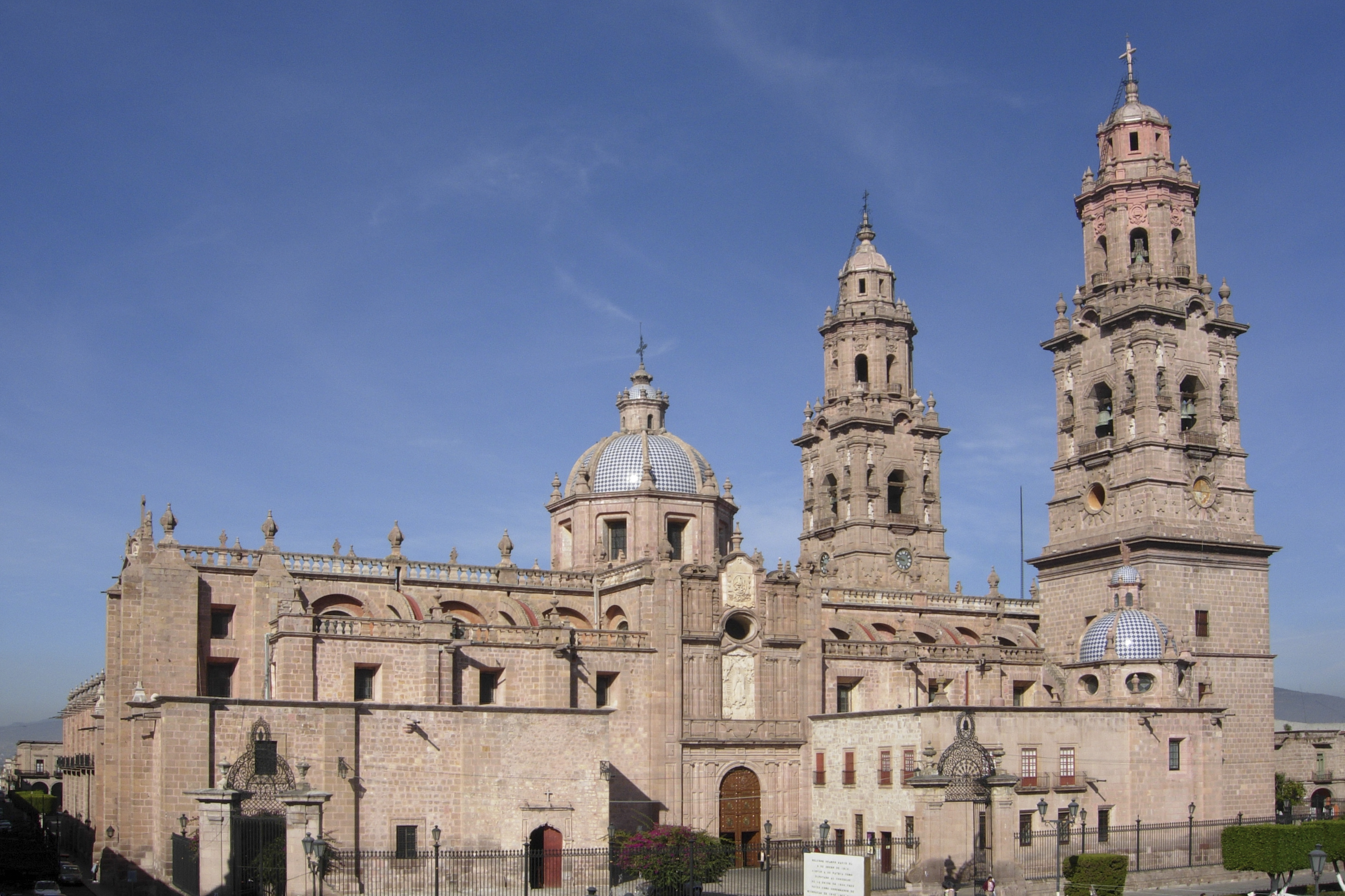
- The pink stone of the Cathedral of Morelia
- Morelia Metropolitan Cathedral
- Location: Morelia, Mexico
- Denomination: Catholic
- Tradition: Roman Rite

History
- Status: Cathedral
- Dedication: Transfiguration of Jesus

Architecture
- Groundbreaking: 6 May 1660
- Completed: 1744

Administration
- Archdiocese: Morelia

The Metropolitan Cathedral of Morelia (Spanish: Catedral Metropolitana de Morelia (San Salvador)) is a religious site that is the seat of the Archdiocese of Morelia of the Catholic church in Mexico. It is located as its name itself says in the city of Morelia, capital of the state of Michoacán, Mexico. The cathedral is located in the first square of the city, forming the trace of the Historic Center of Morelia. The building was built in the 18th century at the time of the viceroyalty, it is Baroque in style and is made of pink stone that gives it a peculiar and characteristic color. An important family group headed by Sebastián de Guedea collaborated in its construction for a long period; They were Andrés, Pedro, Diego, Miguel, Anastacio, Lorenzo and Joseph, all with the surname Guedea.

== General data of interest ==
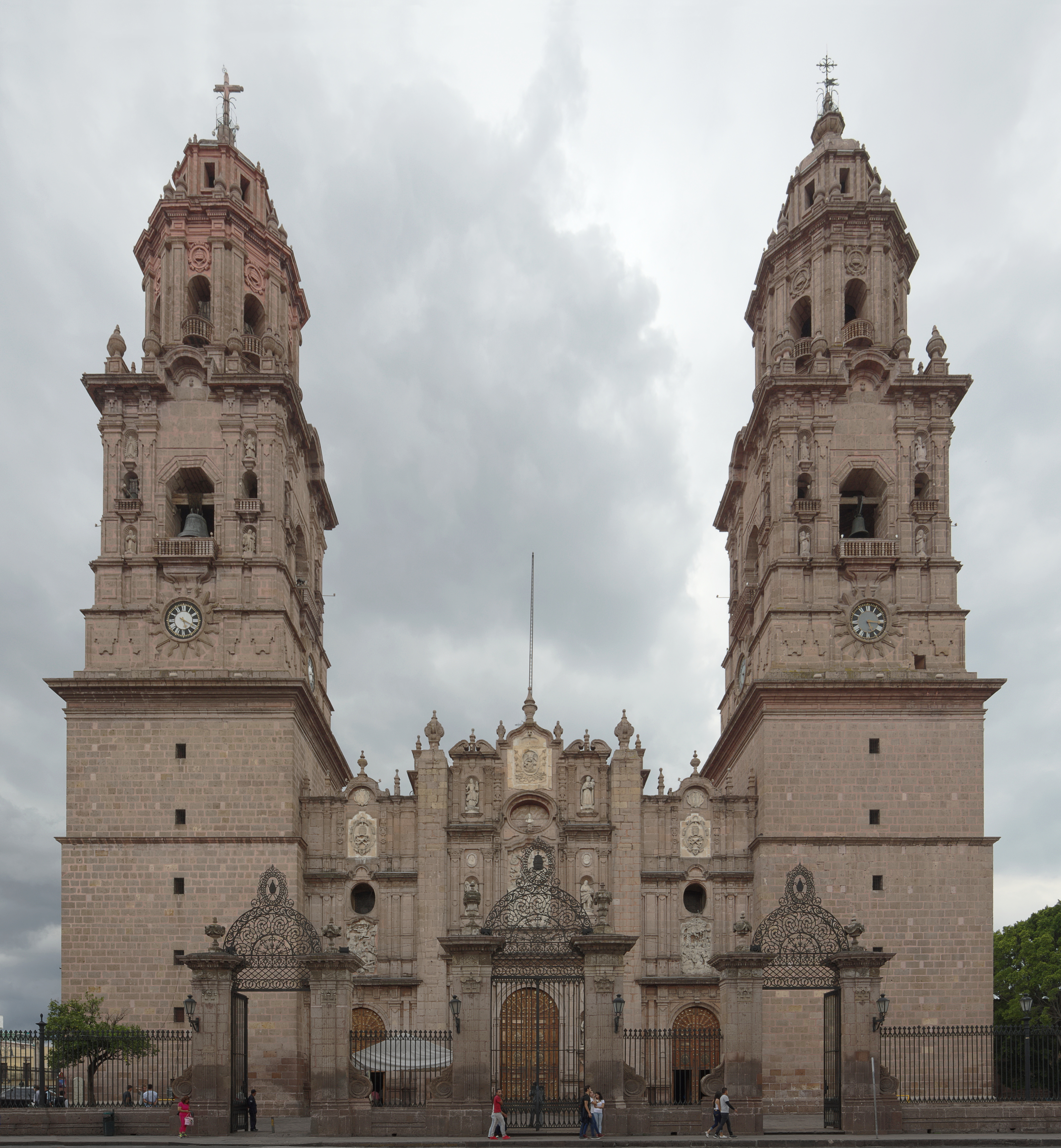
Front façade

Majestic pink quarry building, in Baroque board style. Inside, the Doric order predominates as the basis of the ornamentation and it has Neoclassical altarpieces. Its construction began in 1660 and was completed in 1744. Among the treasures it houses are the Baroque-style Silver Manifestor from the 18th century; the silver Baptismal Font, in Neoclassical style, also from the 18th century; the Monumental Organ, from the beginning of the century and consisting of 4,600 flutes or voices; the image of the Lord of the Sacristy, made with the pre-Hispanic technique of "corn cane paste", from the 16th century, as well as valuable paintings located in the sacristy and the Chapter house.

- Architecturally, the Morelia Cathedral, when compared to other cathedrals in Mexico, is similar to the Mexico City Metropolitan Cathedral, Puebla Cathedral, and even (inside:) the Guadalajara Cathedral.
- The cathedral is the most emblematic and representative building of Morelia given its height, since it has two tall towers, which can be seen throughout the city valley. Due to their height, the towers of the Morelia Cathedral (66.8 m) are the seventh tallest in Mexico, after the towers of the Guadalupano Sanctuary (unfinished cathedral) in Zamora de Hidalgo (107.5 m), the Villahermosa Cathedral (80 m), the Puebla Cathedral in Puebla de Zaragoza (73 m), Cathedral of León, in León, Guanajuato (70 m), the Sanctuary of Guadalupe, in San Luis Potosí City (68 m) and the Mexico City Metropolitan Cathedral (61 m).
- It is the only one of the Mexican cathedrals that faces north and not south.
- It has a new LED lighting, with different colors. On Saturdays, the cathedral offers a light, sound and fireworks show with this illumination.
- The cathedral is dedicated to the Transfiguration and inside it houses two highly venerated images, the Sacred Heart of Jesus, which is the patron saint of the city, and the Lord of the Sacristy, a very old Christ made of corn cane paste, which It is very visited and loved by the parishioners.
- Its architectural beauty and its history are other reasons why it has become an icon of the city.
- Its monumental organ, of German origin at the beginning of the 20th century, was considered the largest organ in Latin America at the beginning of the 20th century and is currently considered one of the most important in Mexico.
- Inside this venue, given its beauty, acoustic sound and ample space, is the setting for various artistic and cultural events such as the Morelia International Organ Festival and the Morelia International Music Festival.
- On February 16, 2016, it was visited by Pope Francis, then Supreme Pontiff of the Catholic Church.
- On February 27, 1805: Agustín de Iturbide and Ana María de Huarte were married, and they would become Emperors of Mexico in 1822.

== History ==
In 1580 the first cathedral was inaugurated, much inferior to the current one in size and artistic value (it was located on the corners of calles Abasolo and Corregidora). However, the growth experienced by the city of Valladolid —now Morelia— at the end of the 16th century and the beginning of the 17th, as well as a fire that severely affected the previous cathedral, made it necessary to think of another larger, more solid, and more important temple. That is why, at the beginning of the 17th century, the procedures for the construction of the new cathedral began.

On May 6, 1660, the first stone was laid by Bishop Friar Marcos Ramírez Del Prado. The construction was in charge of the Italian architect Vizencio Barroquio until his death in 1692, which is why this great architect could not see his monumental work completed. However, only 52 years later his disciples managed to finish the gigantic architectural task, so this magnificent work was completed in 1744.

The interior of the building is Doric in style and consists of three naves, the central one supported by 14 columns. Attached to these naves are four delicately decorated chapels as well as several Neoclassical altarpieces along the 2 side naves. The cathedral has four chapels located at the beginning of the side naves, two of them are placed under the towers and the other two are adjoining, the chapels on the east side were dedicated to the Virgin of la Soledad and the tabernacle of the cathedral, meanwhile one on the west side is dedicated to the Holy Family and the other made of marble as the tomb of archbishops.

There are several rooms such as the capitulary and the sacristy, where you can find old paintings and furniture from the 17th and 19th centuries, despite the many lootings that the Morelia cathedral suffered during the war of independence and the Mexican Revolution, it still preserves great works of artistic, religious and historical value. Inside there are several sculptures, such as a majestic Christ dating from the 16th century, better known as the Lord of the Sacristy. It also includes paintings by prominent artists such as Miguel Cabrera and Juan Rodríguez Juárez, and others are preserved in the sacristy and in the chapter house.

The Cathedral of Morelia has an impressive tubular organ from the beginning of the 20th century, called "San Gregorio Magno", it is German-made and has 4600 voices or flutes, it replaces the old Spanish organ from the 18th century, of which only the wood facades that decorate the tubular organ are preserved.

The exterior of the cathedral is an enormous colossus of pink quarry stone (very frequent material in the region) with two large Baroque-style towers, each more than 65 meters high, it has a triple façade with carved altarpieces, its beautiful wrought-iron grille from the 19th century limits the atrium, in the temple we can appreciate a "Latin cross" type plant with a length of 96 meters, the main Baroque style facade is composed of three levels and unlike other New Spanish cities it faces the main avenue of the city and not the square, on the main portal we can see bas-reliefs and sculptures that refer to the resurrection, the adoration of the shepherds, as well as the adoration of the magicians.

The two twin towers, each more than 65 meters high, exceed the front of the temple, which gives the cathedral an imposing appearance, full of grace and balance, an iron cross is placed on the tip of one of the towers, which symbolizes "the divine nature of Christ", while in the other there is a stone cross that represents "the human nature of Jesus", there is also another dome, which crowns one of the chapels of the building, finally we find that the main dome is covered with azulejos and supported by a large circular drum.

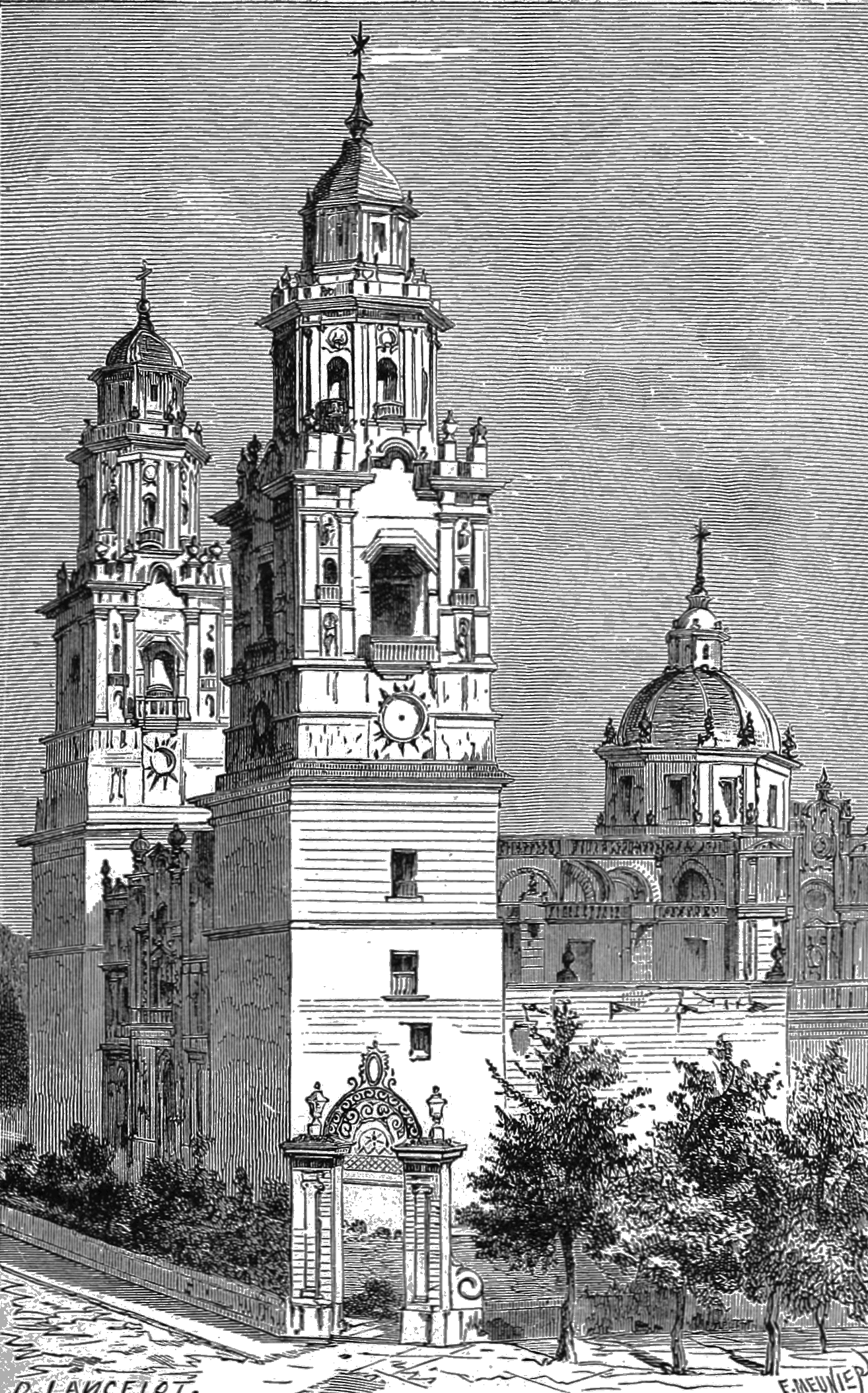
Cathedral of Morelia in 1889 by Susan Hale.

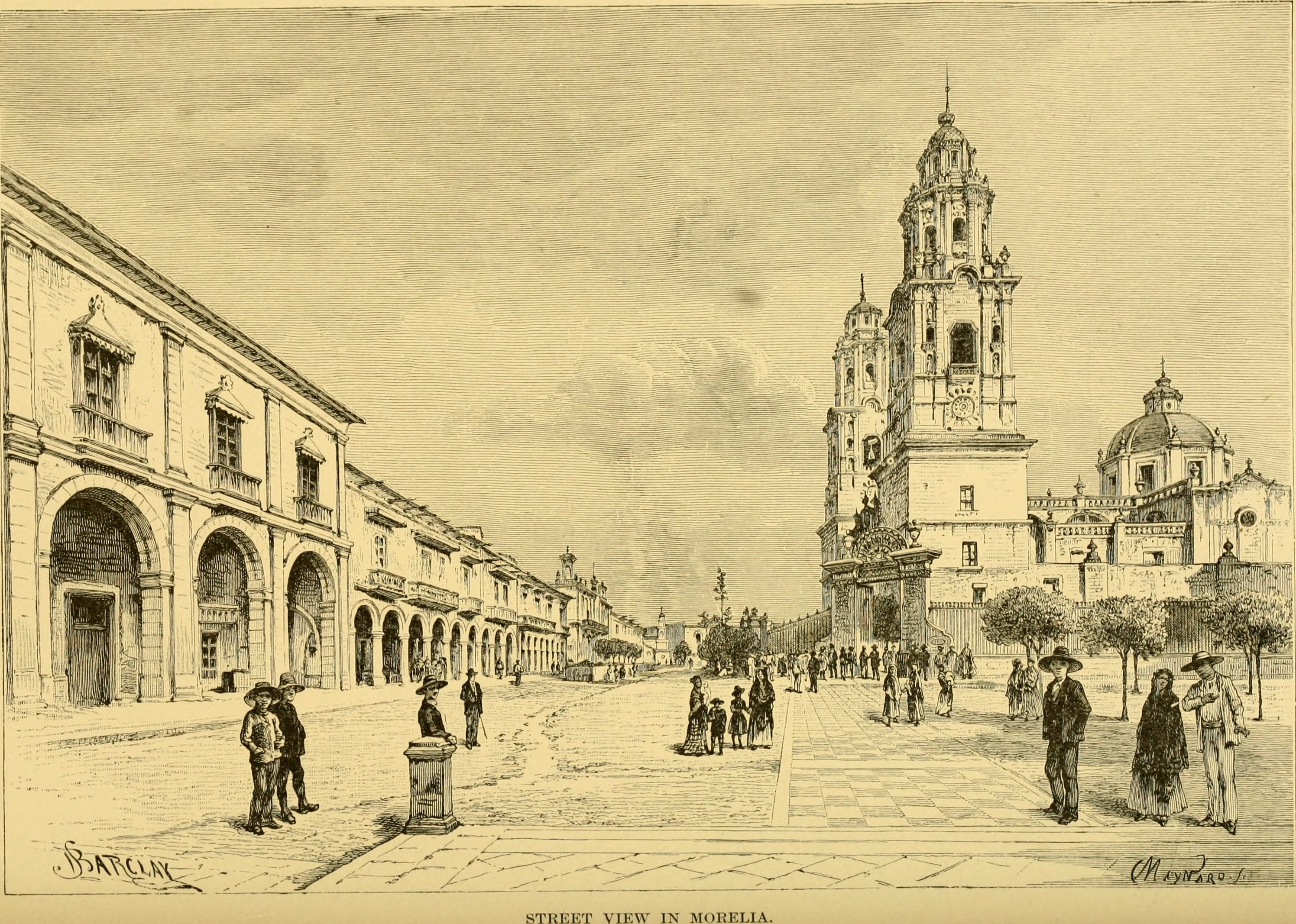
Cathedral of Morelia in 1891 by Élisée Reclus.

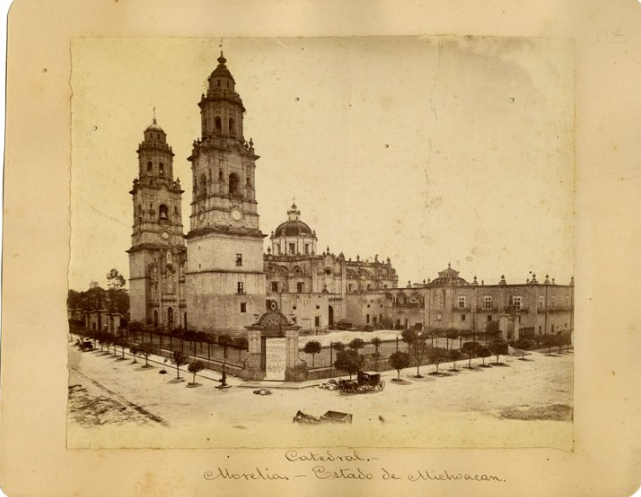
Cathedral of Morelia in 1901. Instituto Nacional de Antropología e Historia.

== Architectural description ==
=== The exterior ===
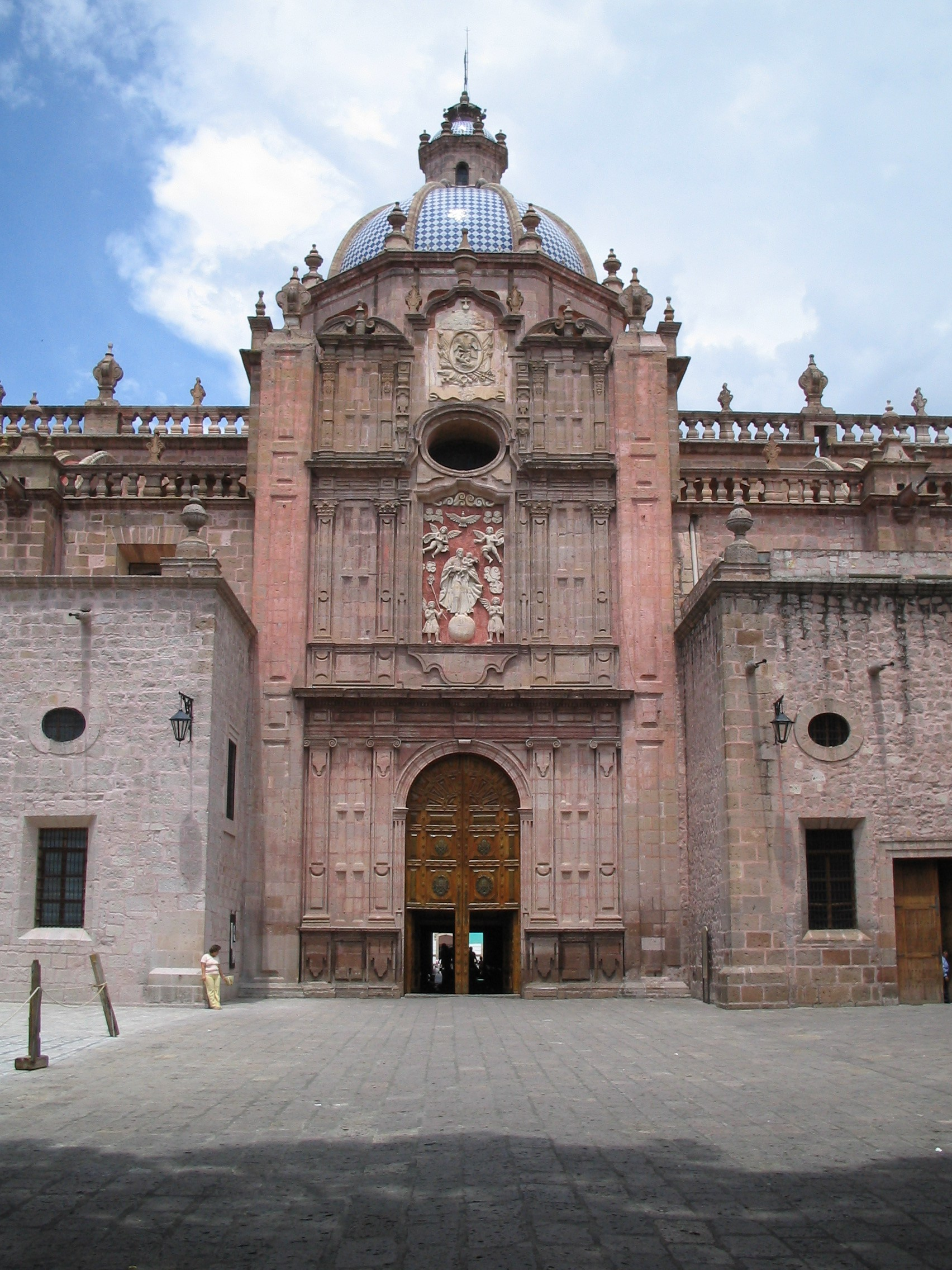
West façade of the cathedral.

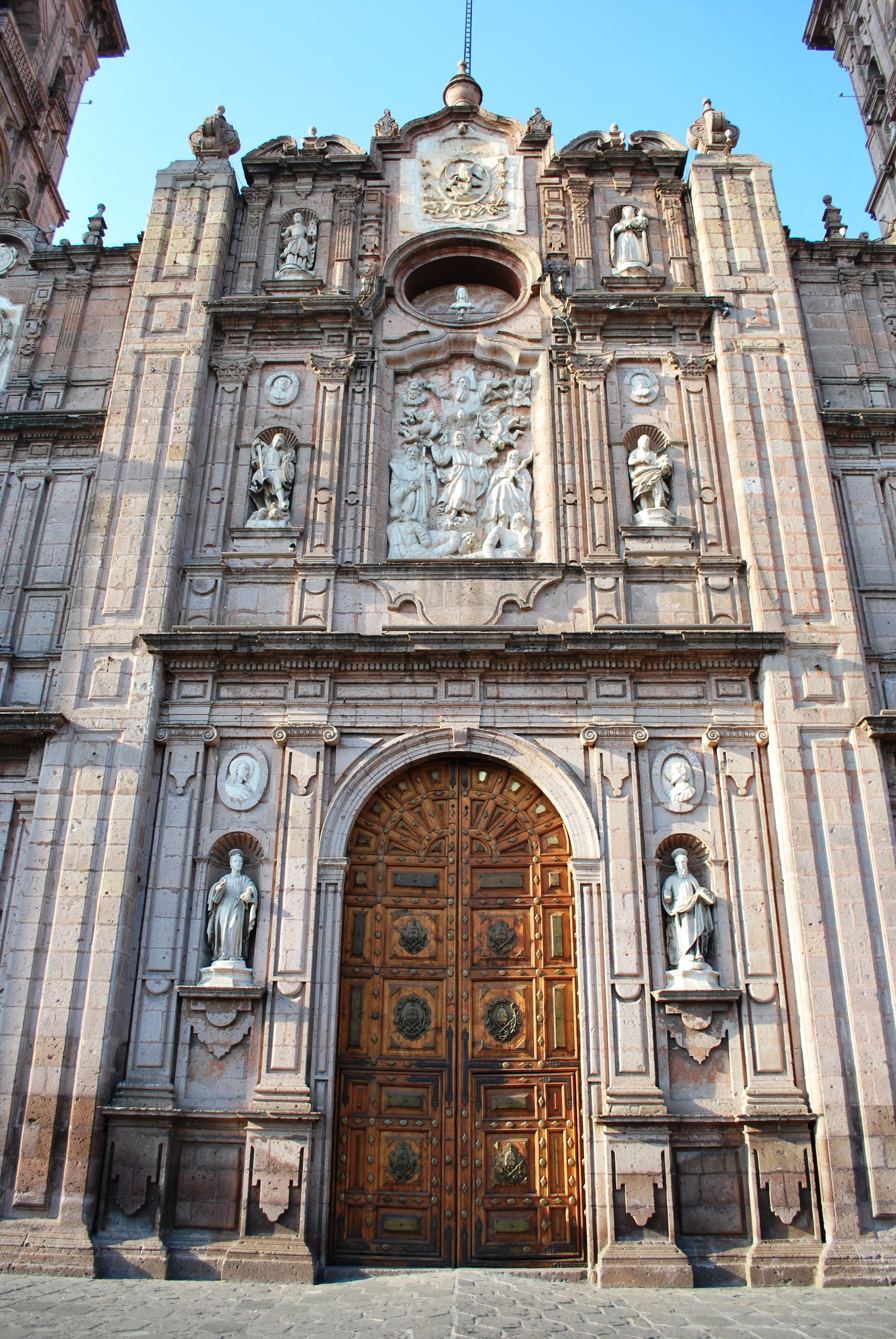
Main portal

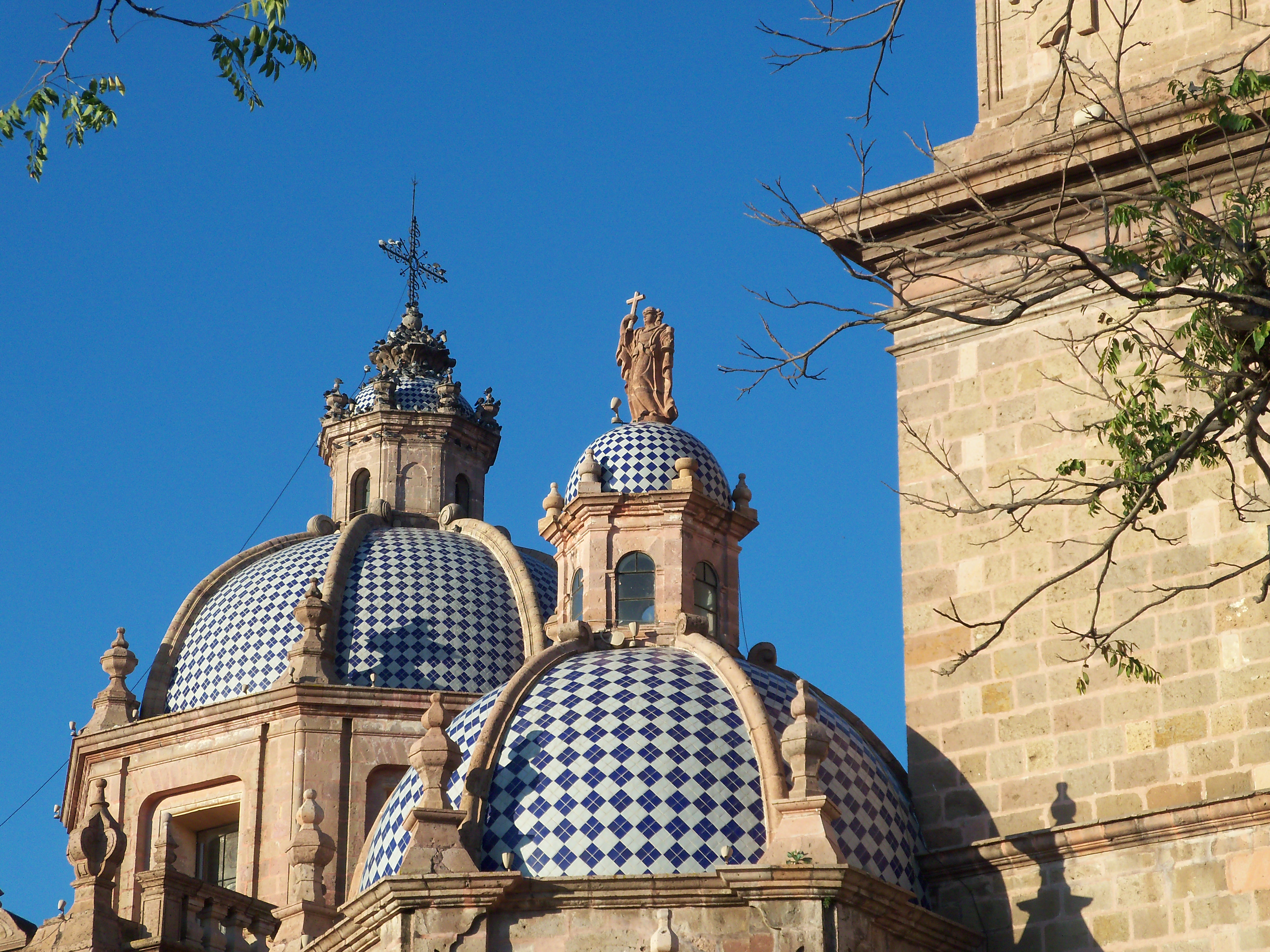
Domes

It is a huge colossus of pink quarry with two large towers 66.8 m high, (twin towers) of checkered Baroque style. It has a triple façade (one front and two sides) with carved altarpieces. The temple has a floor plan of the Latin cross type with a length of 96 m and a total width of 62 m. Limiting the atrium is a beautiful wrought iron grille dating from the 19th century.

- Façades:
- Tripartite façade: The main façade of the cathedral, which is made up of three bodies (horizontal levels defined by cornices) and corresponds to the Baroque style, faces the main avenue of the city (Avenida Madero), and not the square, as it is customary in most New Spanish cities. The main portal is decorated with sculptures and bas-reliefs that allude to the Transfiguration of Christ, the Adoration of the Shepherds, as well as the Adoration of the Magi. There are also statues of St. Peter, St. Paul, St. John the Baptist, St. Michael the Archangel, St. Agatha of Sicily and St. Rose of Lima.
  - Side Façades:
    - East Portal: This side façade is dedicated to the Virgin of Guadalupe, patron saint of America.
    - West Portal: This side façade is dedicated to St. Joseph, the first patron saint of the city.
- Towers: On the other hand, the two twin towers, each with three sections and 62 m high (66.7 if the crosses in the topped are considered) cross the portal of the temple, which gives the building an imposing appearance, but does not devoid of grace and balance. One of the towers is crowned with an iron cross, which symbolizes the divine nature of Christ, while the other tower is crowned with a stone cross, which represents the human nature of Jesus.
  - East Tower
  - West Tower
- Central dome: The main dome is covered with azulejos and inside it is supported by a huge circular tholobate. There is also another dome that crowns one of the building's chapels.
- Dome of the shrine (Dome of the sagrario)

=== Interior ===
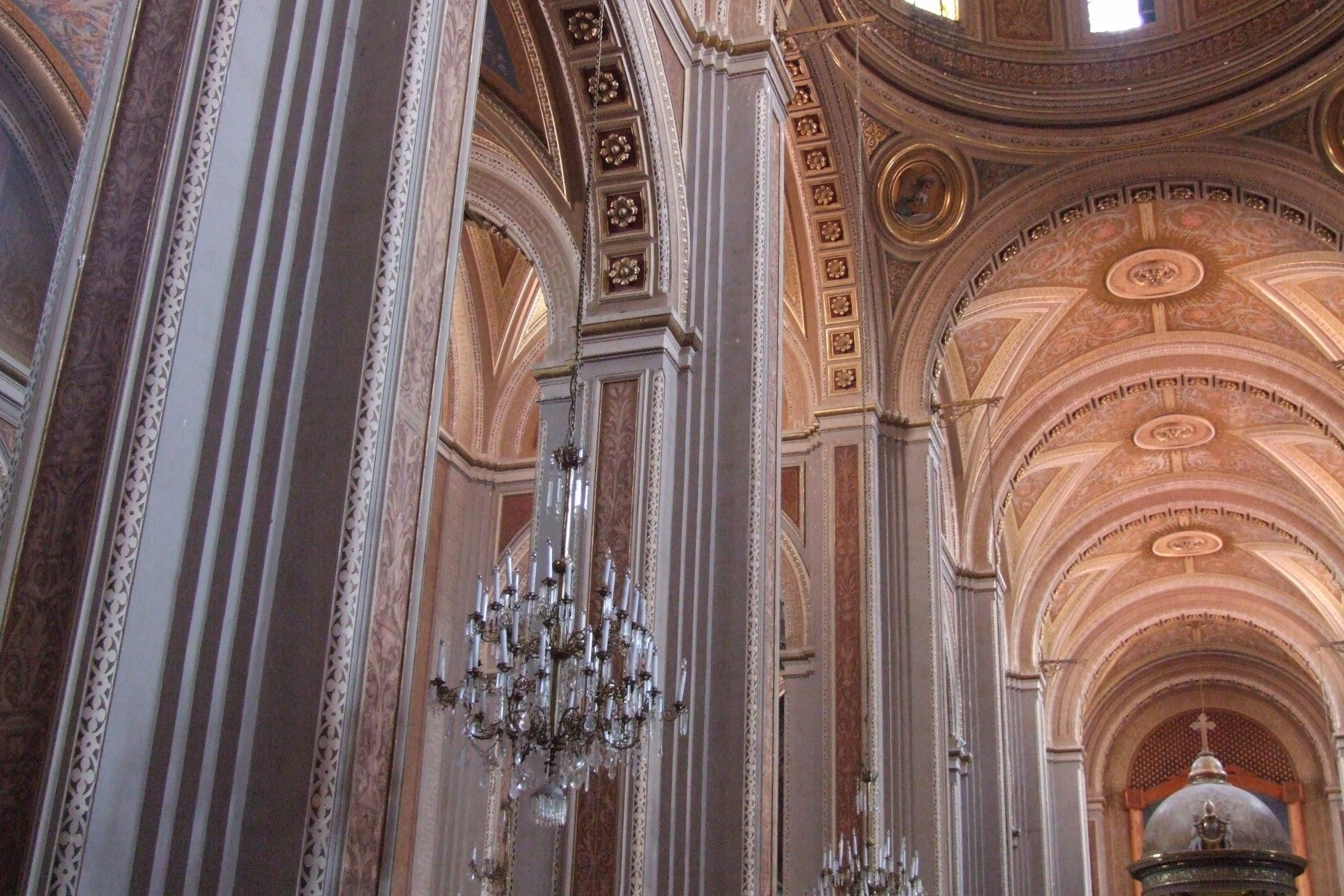
The Neoclassical interior

The interior of the building contrasts with the exterior, since it is Doric in style and consists of three naves, the central one being supported by fourteen columns. In addition, attached to the lateral naves, there are four delicately decorated chapels and multiple Neoclassical altarpieces along the two lateral naves.

- Naves:
  - Central nave: In the main altar there is a cypress, made up of four columns that support a dome, and inside it a silver manifestor. In the central nave there is a pulpit made of carved wood.
  - Side naves: Two side naves to the central one, have Neoclassical altars dedicated to various saints, in the background the naves are topped by large altars, one on the east side dedicated to the Lord of the Sacristy and another on the west side dedicated to the Sacred Heart, patron saint of the city.
    - East side nave:
    - West side nave:
- Chapels: the cathedral has four chapels, located at the beginning of the side naves, 2 chapels just below the towers and the other two adjoining. The chapels on the eastern side are dedicated to the Virgen de los Dolores or "La Dolorosa" and to the Tabernacle of the cathedral. On the west side, one is dedicated to the Holy Family and the other is a funerary chapel that houses the marble tombs of Archbishops.
  - Chapel of the Tabernacle (Chapel del Sagrario)
  - Chapel of la Soledad
  - Chapel of la Sagrada Familia or of los Mártires
  - Chapel of San Jerónimo
- Rooms: has several rooms including the Chapter House, the Sacristy, among others, where you can find old 18th-century and 19th-century paintings and furniture.
- Sacristy Room:
- Chapter House:

This magnificent architectural work, due to the clarity of its profiles, chiaroscuro and the way of carving the façades between the buttresses, is compared by Joaquín Bérchez, with the façade of the Granada Cathedral by Alonso Cano and with works by Diego Antonio Díaz in Seville.

== Artistic works ==
It still preserves great treasures. Works of great artistic, religious and historical value.

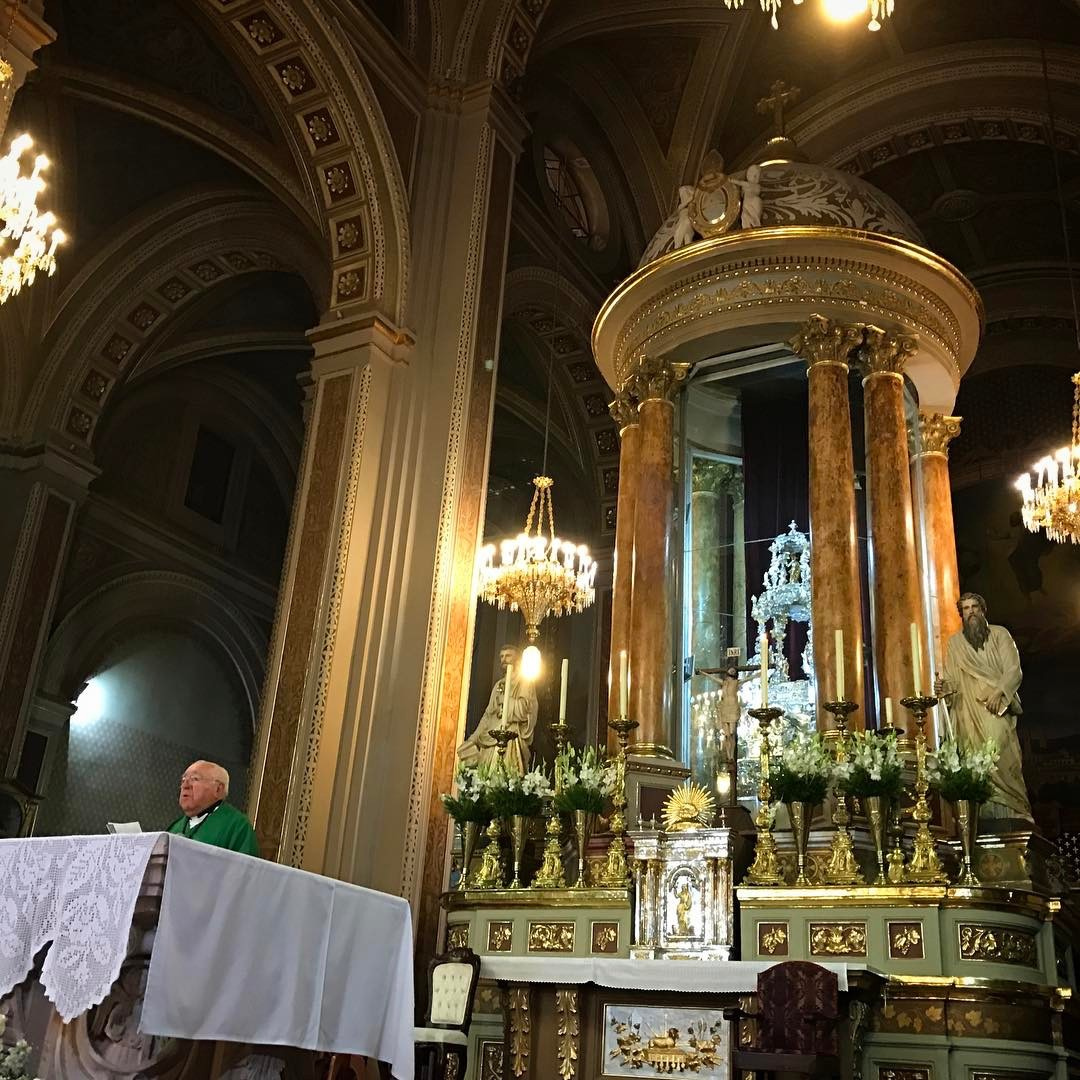
Altarpiece and Manifestor

- Goldsmith:
  - "Manifestor:" Of the 18th century, silver that measures 3.19 m high, adorned with 29 statuettes and 42 gilded reliefs that communicate a message about the Eucharistic presence of Christ.
  - Baptismal Font: piece of fine silverware with a strong Neoclassical hue. Agustín de Iturbide and José María Morelos were baptized there.
- Sculptures: There are also multiple sculptures inside, standing out a Christ, known as the Lord of the Sacristy, which dates from the 16th century.
  - Lord of the Sacristy:
  - Sacred Heart:
- Ceramics:
  - Chinese Tibores (vessels)
- Oil paintings: There are paintings by the most prominent New Spanish painter, Miguel Cabrera, as well as by the painter Juan Rodríguez Juárez; These paintings are preserved in the sacristy and in the chapter house.
  - Monumental oil painting of the Transfiguration:
  - Virgin of Guadalupe Oil:
- Relics:
  - Relics of the Martyrs: the relics of the Martyrs Saint Pío and Saint Christopher are preserved, which are shown at audience in glass cases in one of the chapels in the side naves.
- Furniture:
  - Pulpit:
  - Choir stalls:
  - Archbishop's Chair:
  - Tenebrario: Triangle-shaped candlestick, made of carved wood, used for praying the offices
- Other art pieces:
  - Monumental Organ of the Cathedral of Morelia: The cathedral has an important tubular organ with 4,600 voices or flutes, built in 1907, German-made, Churrigueresque Revival style, called "San Gregorio Magno", replacing the old Spanish organ from the 18th century of which only its carved wooden facades are preserved and decorate the electromechanical organ. In the month of December the Morelia International Organ Festival takes place. The festival has been in charge of the dean and teacher the organist Alfonso Vega Núñez who has invited important organists from all over the world to perform concerts, among which the French Jean Guillou stands out. Some of the presentations include the participation of the Michoacán State Symphony Orchestra.
  - Commemorative plaque for the visit of S.S. Pope Francis
