= Torna atrás =

Term describing a type of mixed race person

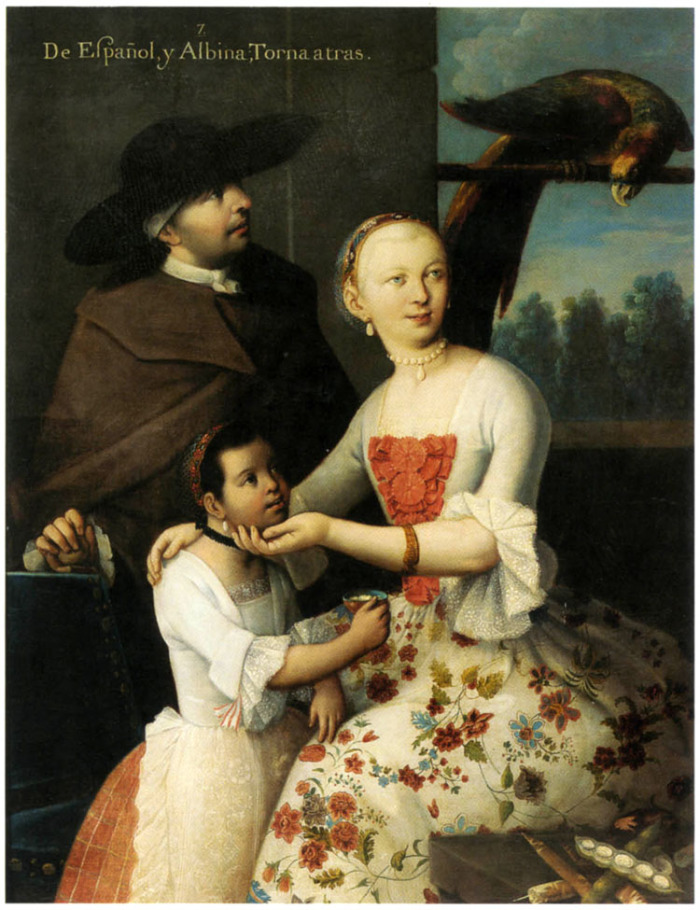
Spanish father and Albina mother, torna atrás child. Miguel Cabrera, 1763 Mexico

Torna atrás (Spanish pronunciation: [toɾnaˈtɾas]) or tornatrás is a term used in 18th-century casta paintings to portray a mestizo or mixed-race person who showed phenotypic characteristics of only one of the "original races", such as European or Amerindian ancestry. The term was also used to describe an individual whose parentage was half white and half "albino".

== Spanish America ==
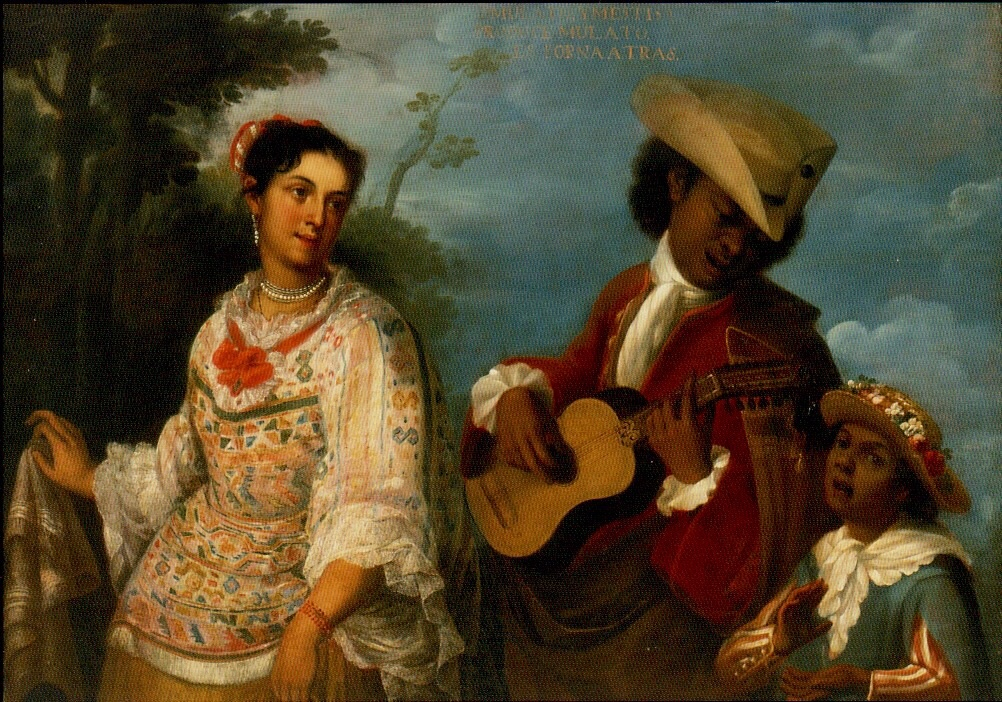
De Mulato y Mestiza, produce mulato es torna atrás. Attributed to Juan Rodríguez Juárez, ca. 1715. Private collection

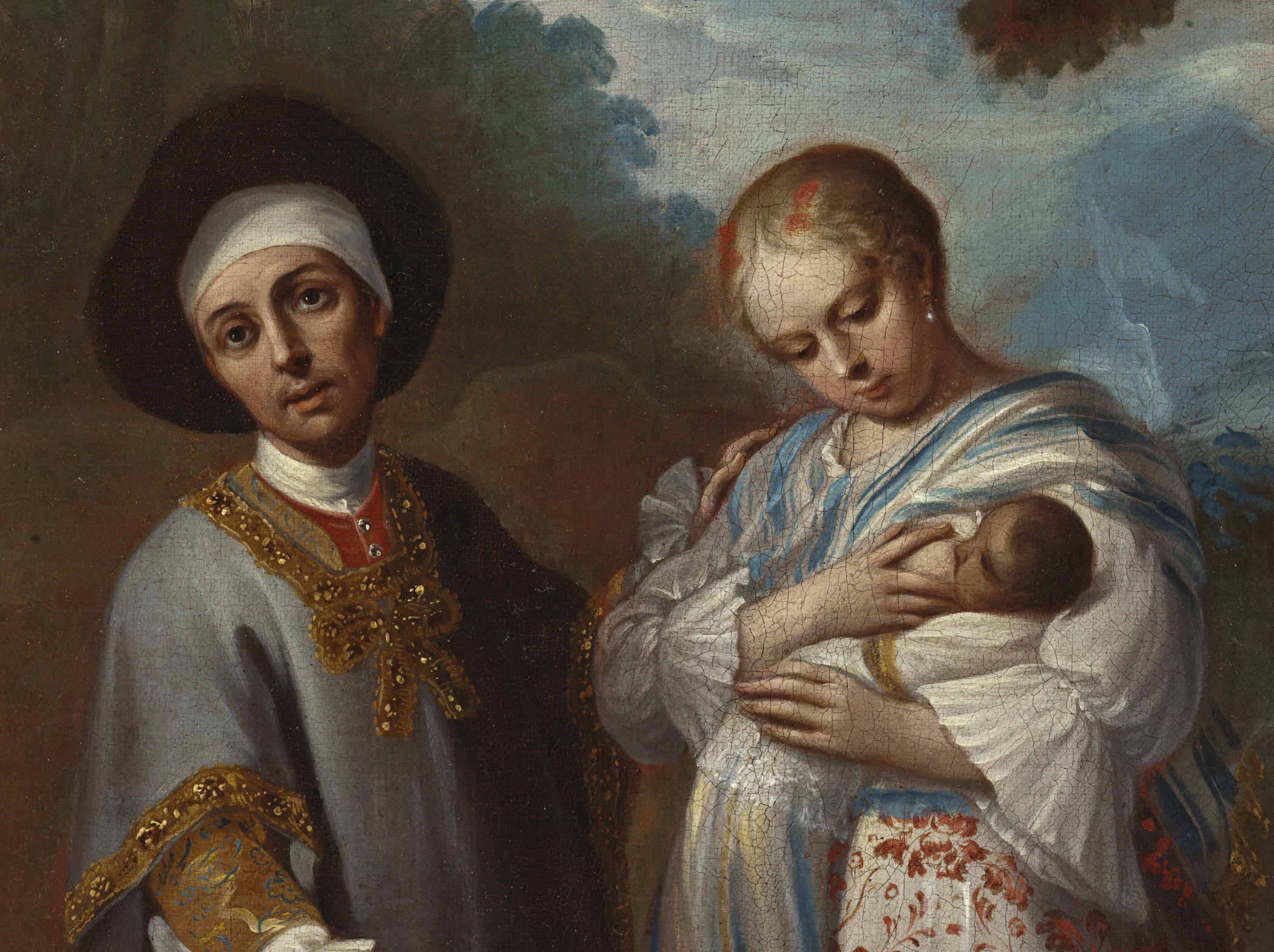
Casta painting of a Spanish father, albino mother, and torna atrás child. Juan Patricio Morlete Ruiz (Mexico, circa 1760)

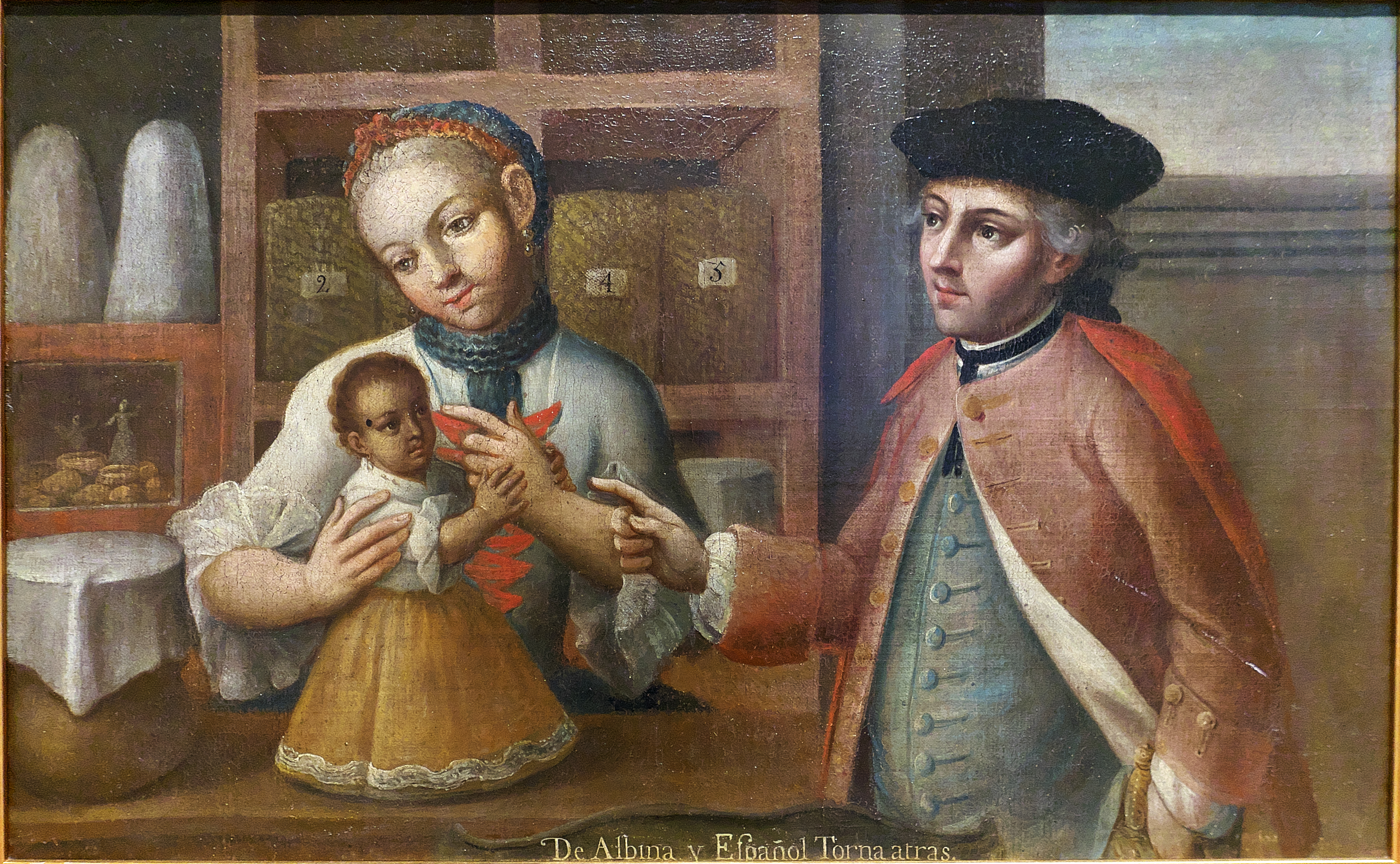
De Albina y Español, Torna atrás. Attributed to Juan Patricio Morlete Ruiz (1701-1770)

The term torna atrás (in English, similar in meaning to "throwback" or "harken back to") could also refer to the appearance of racial characteristics not visible in the parents. An example is the child of a white person and a light-skinned person of partial African ancestry (albino)^{[a]} born with darker skin than their African-descended parent.

The term torna atrás does not appear as a legal category in colonial documentation, but it is often shown in families portrayed in casta paintings in eighteenth-century Mexico.

Miguel Cabrera, 1763
- De Español y d'India; Mestiza
- De español y Mestiza, Castiza
- De Español y Castiza, Español
- De Español y Negra, Mulata
- De Español y Mulata; Morisca
- De Español y Morisca; Albina
- De Español y Albina; Torna atrás
- De Español y Torna atrás; Tente en el aire
- De Negro y d'India, China cambuja.
- De Chino cambujo y d'India; Loba
- De Lobo y d'India, Albarazado
- De Albarazado y Mestiza, Barcino
- De Indio y Barcina; Zambuigua
- De Castizo y Mestiza; Chamizo
- De Mestizo y d'India; Coyote
- Indios gentiles (Heathen Indians)
Andrés de Islas, 1774
- De Español e India, nace Mestizo
- De Español y Mestiza, nace Castizo
- De Castizo y Española, nace Española
- De Español y Negra, nace Mulata
- De Español y Mulata, nace Morisco
- De Español y Morisca, nace Albino
- De Español y Albina, nace Torna atrás
- De Indio y Negra, nace Lobo
- De Indio y Mestiza, nace Coyote
- De Lobo y Negra, nace Chino
- De Chino e India, nace Cambujo
- De Cambujo e India, nace Tente en el aire
- De Tente en el aire y Mulata, nace Albarazado
- De Albarazado e India, nace Barcino
- De Barcino y Cambuja, nace Calpamulato
- Indios Mecos bárbaros (Barbarian Meco Indians)
Luis de Mena, ca. 1750
- Española + Indio, Mestizo
- Mestizo + Española, Castizo
- Castiza + Espanol, Española
- Español + Negra, Mulato
- Mulato + Española, Morisca
- Morisca + Español, Albino Torna-atrás
- Mestiza + Indio, Lobo
- Lobo + India, Indio

== Philippines ==
The term tornatrás was also used in the Philippines during the Spanish colonial era from the 16th to 19th century, to describe persons of mixed Austronesian (referred to in Spanish as indio), Chinese (referred to in Spanish as Sangley), and Spanish ancestry (referred to in Spanish as español; in Filipino/Tagalog as kastilà), specifically either filipinos/insulares (Spaniard born/raised in Spanish Philippines), or americanos (Criollo born/raised in Spanish America), or peninsulares (Spaniard born/raised in Iberia), or simply mixed Chinese and Spanish ancestry.

Although tornatrás was originally used to describe a descendant of mestizos, albinos, and Europeans, in the Philippines the term referred to those born from a Spanish father and a mestiza de Sangley (mixed native and Sangley Chinese) mother; they can be born to any mixed native and Spanish parent and any mixed native and Chinese parent. Most tornatrás were of the middle class in Spanish Philippines, used Spanish as their primary language with various Philippine languages, and in many cases converted to Catholicism. Examples of famous tornatrás persons are José Rizal, Andrés Bonifacio, and Manuel L. Quezon.

== See also ==
- Castas
- Filipino mestizo
- Miscegenation
- Morisco
- Mulato
- Atavism
- Passing (racial identity)
- Sandra Laing

== Notes ==
- ^{1} Should not be confused with Albinism
