= Fernando de Alencastre, 1st Duke of Linares =

Mexican politician

The Most Excellent The Duke of Linares GE
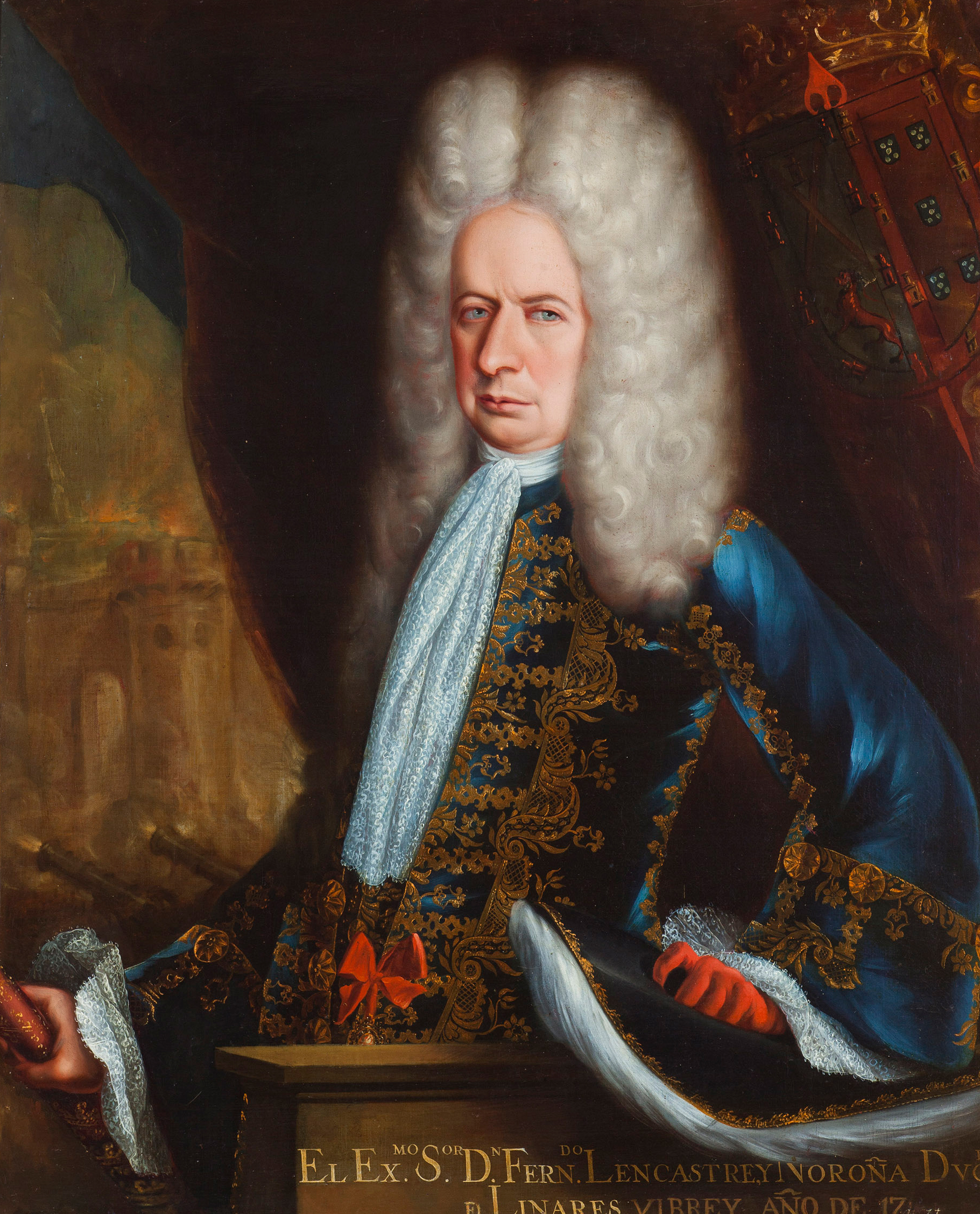
- Portrait by Juan Rodríguez Juárez

35th Viceroy of New Spain
- In office November 13, 1710 – July 16, 1716
- Monarch: Philip V
- Preceded by: The Duke of Alburquerque
- Succeeded by: The Duke of Arión

Fernando de Alencastre Noroña y Silva, 1st Duke of Linares, GE (April 15, 1662 in Madrid, Spain – June 3, 1717 in Mexico City) was a Spanish nobleman and military officer. He also served as Viceroy of New Spain, from January 15, 1711 to August 15, 1716.

== Early career ==
Alencastre Noroña y Silva was a descendant of Fernando de Noroña, Duke of Linares, and thus from a distinguished Spanish family with origins in the Portuguese nobility. In addition to the two titles he inherited, he was knight commander of the Order of Santiago, lord of the bedchamber of the king, and lieutenant general in the army. He was also knight commander of the royal arms in the Kingdom of Naples, honorary viceroy of Sardinia, and vicar general of La Toscana.

Alencastre was an early donor to the Jesuit missions in Baja California, providing 5,000 reales as seed money in 1697.

== Viceroy of New Spain ==
In 1711 Fernando de Alencastre became the colonial viceroy and captain general of the Viceroyalty of New Spain, and president of the Audiencia Real.

On August 16, 1711 there was a strong earthquake that damaged many buildings and resulted in significant loss of life. The earthquake was said to last half an hour. The viceroy is said to have paid from his own funds to help the poor and to restore some of the buildings.

In 1713, Mexico City experienced a snowfall unlike any earlier recorded. The harvest failed, and a severe famine resulted. The streets were filled with people begging for bread. Perhaps as a result of the famine, a severe plague broke out, continuing into the following year. Many sick people were abandoned on the streets. Many people died and were buried in common graves. Both the viceroy and the archbishop of Mexico, José Lanziego, reportedly paid from their own funds to help the poor during these catastrophes.

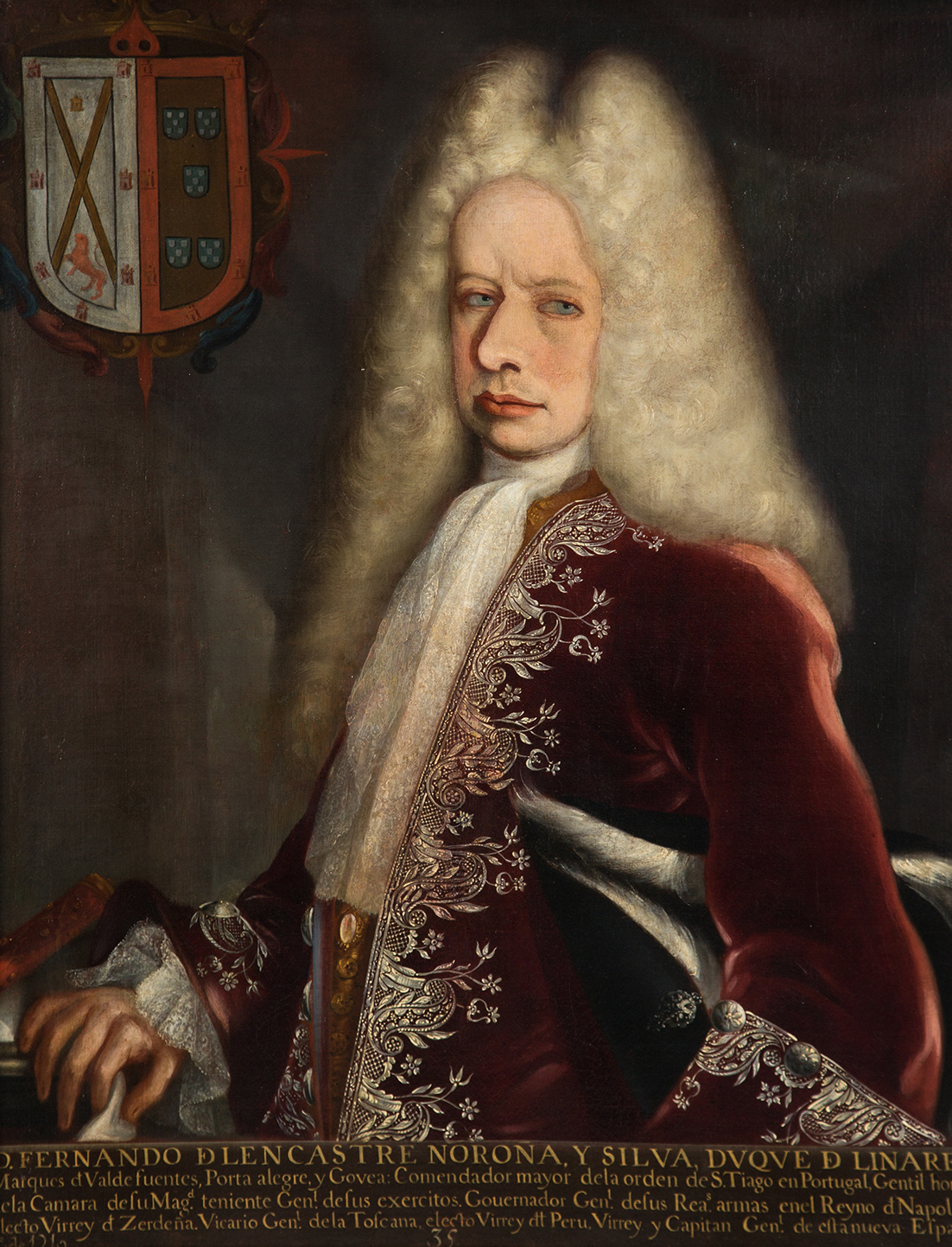
Portrait of Alencastre

Alencastre ordered the construction of four well-armed, light warships at Coatzacoalcos to reinforce the Armada de Barlovento (coast guard). He bought 600 new muskets in Cantabria for the militia, and sent money for the repair of fortifications at Cumaná.

=== Spanish shipping trade ===
Around 1711 Alencastre authored a proposal to the Council of the Indies (Consejo de Indias) in Spain to legitimize private trade between the Viceroyalty of New Spain and the Viceroyalty of Peru between their Pacific Ocean ports. Spain had supplied Peru by bringing goods by government fleet to the Atlantic port of Portobelo in Panama, from whence they were carted to Lima overland. There was no direct trade allowed between the Spanish colonies.

However, the Spanish government fleet did not arrive for eleven years between 1696 and 1707, nor between 1708 and 1711. The problem was caused by the War of the Spanish Succession, making it difficult for the Spanish fleet to cross the Atlantic. In their place, the French were sailing from Saint Malo in France, around South America's Cape Horn, to the seaport of Callao in Peru. At Callao, the French sold European merchandise for Peruvian silver, and then sailed to Asia trading the silver for Asian products (spices and especially textiles), and then returning to Callao to sell the Asian goods for silver and/or cacao, and then returning to France.

Viceroy Alencastre suggested that Spain permit private Spanish merchant ships to sail between the Pacific ports of Acapulco and Callao. In Acapulco, they could pick up Asian goods shipped on the Spanish government's Manila galleons, and they could also purchase European goods shipped on the Spanish government's Atlantic fleet to Veracruz and brought across Mexico. Alencastre pointed out that banning Spanish merchants in the Americas from trading between Acapulco (New Spain) and Callao (Peru) was simply making French merchants wealthy.

The Council of the Indies rejected the idea, hinting that Viceroy Alencastre himself might be profiting from Pacific trade:

"without the toleration of the Viceroys, governors, and ministers of those Kingdoms [New Spain and Peru], the perpetrators of fraud could not continue business with their goods with the freedom and openness with which they have done so in recent years."

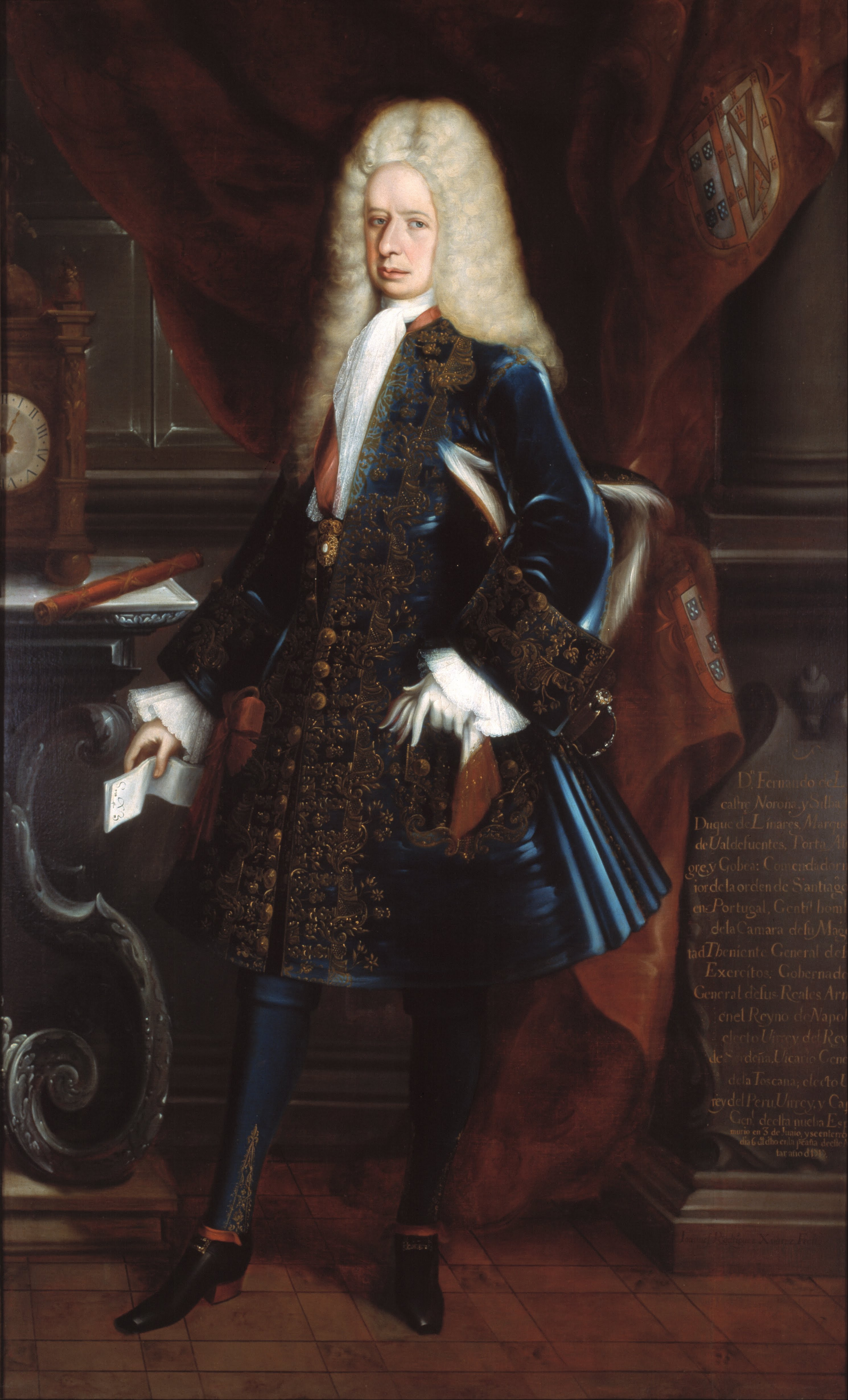
The Duke of Linares as Viceroy of New Spain, by Juan Rodriguez Juarez

=== Foreign affairs ===
Under the terms of the Peace of Utrecht, Spain granted the Asiento de Negros, a monopoly contract granting the recipient the right to sell African slaves in Spanish America, to the Kingdom of Great Britain for 30 years. The British government subsequently transferred the Asiento de Negros to the South Sea Company. As British merchants began to sell slaves in Spanish America, they also started secretly trading in unauthorised goods and merchandise with Spanish colonists eager to circumvent Spain's mercantilist policies, which worsened Anglo-Spanish relations. Another foreign policy issue between Spain and Britain during Alencastre's tenure as viceroy was the existence of a British colony at Laguna de Términos, whose colonists harvested tropical timber, in particular logwood trees, and exported them to American and European markets in violation of Spanish law.

=== Internal affairs and new settlements ===
The pueblo of San Felipe de Linares was founded by Sebastián Villegas Cumplido in September 1711, and named in honor of the Viceroy. It is located in present-day state of Nuevo León.

Alencastre authorized expeditions in 1716 and in 1718, to reoccupy the Spanish Texas territory after its abandonment in 1690, and establish missions and a settlement there. The pueblo of San Antonio was founded in 1718. He also authorized establishing missions in Nuevo Mexico, present day New Mexico. The indigenous and sophisticated Pueblo peoples continued in revolt against the occupation of their homeland, taken by the Spanish in 1598 as the Province of Santa Fe de Nuevo México.

In 1711 Father Eusebio Kino, renowned explorer and missionary in Sonora, Baja California and Alta California, died in Magdelena, Sonora.

Alencastre constructed the aqueduct of Arcos de Belén to Salto de Agua in Mexico City. He continued and expanded La Acordada, a special tribunal dedicated to fighting robbery in the cities and on the highways. He prohibited the manufacture of the alcoholic beverage aguardiente from sugar cane, and made attempts to suppress immorality among the regular clergy.

The Crown fixed the annual contribution of New Spain to the mother country at one million pesos. To raise this money required some ingenuity on the part of the viceroy.

On October 28, 1715 an insurrection broke out among the garrison at San Juan de Ulúa, near Veracruz. For two years the soldiers had received only partial pay. The rebels were tried, convicted, and pardoned. Afterwards they continued to press their grievances.

Alencastre founded the first public library and the first natural history museum in New Spain. King Philip V of Spain directed that the museum send to Spain samples of rocks, plants, fruits, animals and other things found in Mexico but unknown in Spain. The viceroy copiously complied.

== Retirement and death ==
In 1716 he turned over the office to his successor, Baltasar de Zúñiga, 1st Duke of Arión. He left for Zúñiga a written Instrucción, in which he detailed the sad social and economic conditions of the colony.

He died the following year in Mexico City, and was interred in the church of the Discalced Carmelites. He left many charitable donations in his will, including an addition 5,000 for the Jesuit missions of Baja California.
