= Juan Rodríguez Juárez =

Spanish artist (1675–1728)

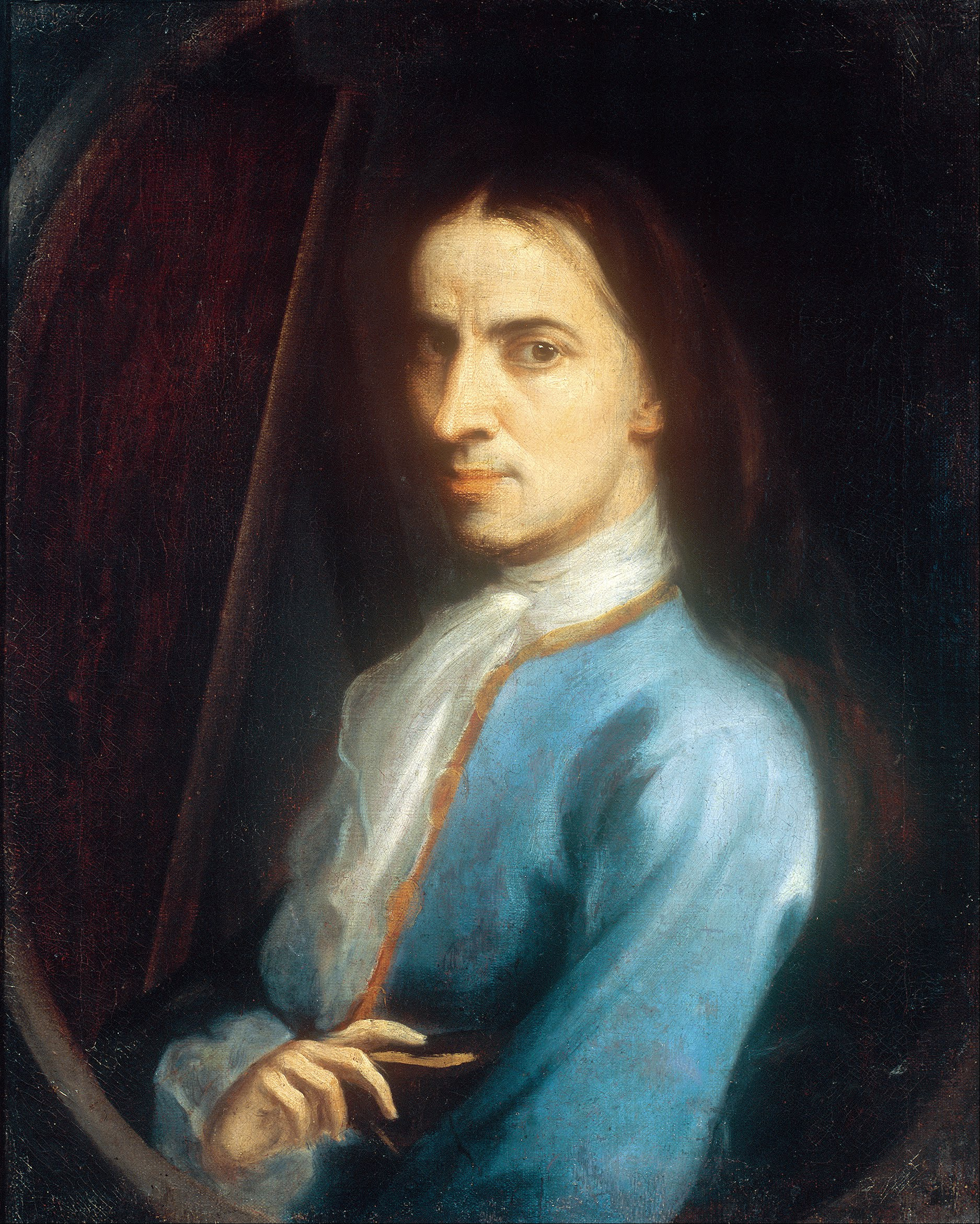
Self-portrait

Juan Rodríguez Juárez (1675 – 1728) was a Spanish painter. He was a member of a Spanish family long noted for their accomplishments in the world of painting. His brother was Nicolás Rodríguez Juárez (1667–1734), also an established painter in New Spain. He was the son of Antonio Rodríguez (1636–91), a notable Spanish painter. His maternal grandfather José Juárez (1617–1661) and maternal great-great-grandfather Luis Juárez (1585–1639) were also notable painters in Spanish history and prominent in the Baroque era.

== Life and career ==
Juan Rodríguez Juárez was born in Mexico City. As with most artists in New Spain during the late Baroque period, Juan Rodríguez Juárez produced religious art. He also followed the trend of painting portraits of high officials, such as Viceroy Linares and the local nobility. These works followed European models, with symbols of rank and titles either displayed unattached in the outer portions or worked into another element of the paintings such as curtains. Rodríguez Juárez painted "an extraordinary self-portrait, symptomatic of the changing role of the artist in the colony in the eighteenth century."

An early set of casta paintings (c. 1715) is attributed to him; they are in a private collection at Breamore House, Hampshire, England. Separate canvases show Mexican racial mixtures in a hierarchical order, with Spanish-Indian mixtures coming first, followed by Spanish-African mixtures, then further permutations of racially mixed couples and offspring. They are as follows: Spaniard and India produce a Mestizo; Spaniard and Mestiza produce a Castizo; Castizo and Spanish woman produce Spaniard. Spaniard and Negra produce a Mulato; Spaniard and Mulata produce a Morisca; Spaniard and Morisca produce an Albino. From Mulato and Mestiza produce a Torna atrás. From Negro and India, Lobo ("wolf"); From Indio and Loba produce a crinkly haired (grifo) "Hold-Yourself-In-Midair" (tente en el air); From Lobo and India produce a Torna atrás ("throw back"); From Mestizo and India produce a Coyote; Mexican Indians; Otomí Indians en route to the fair; Barbarian Indians (Indios Bárbaros).

== Gallery ==
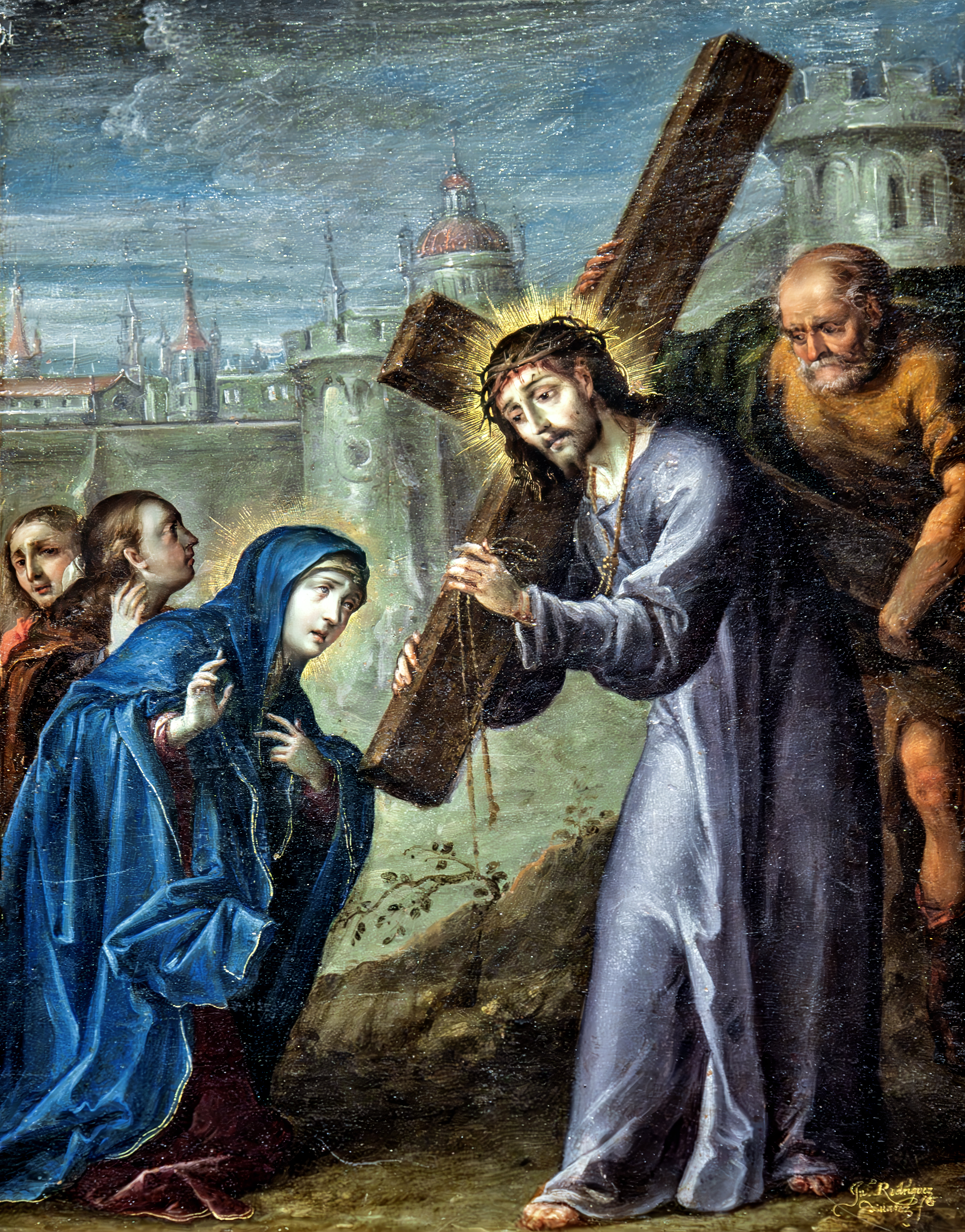
Christ carrying his Cross - Musée Goya

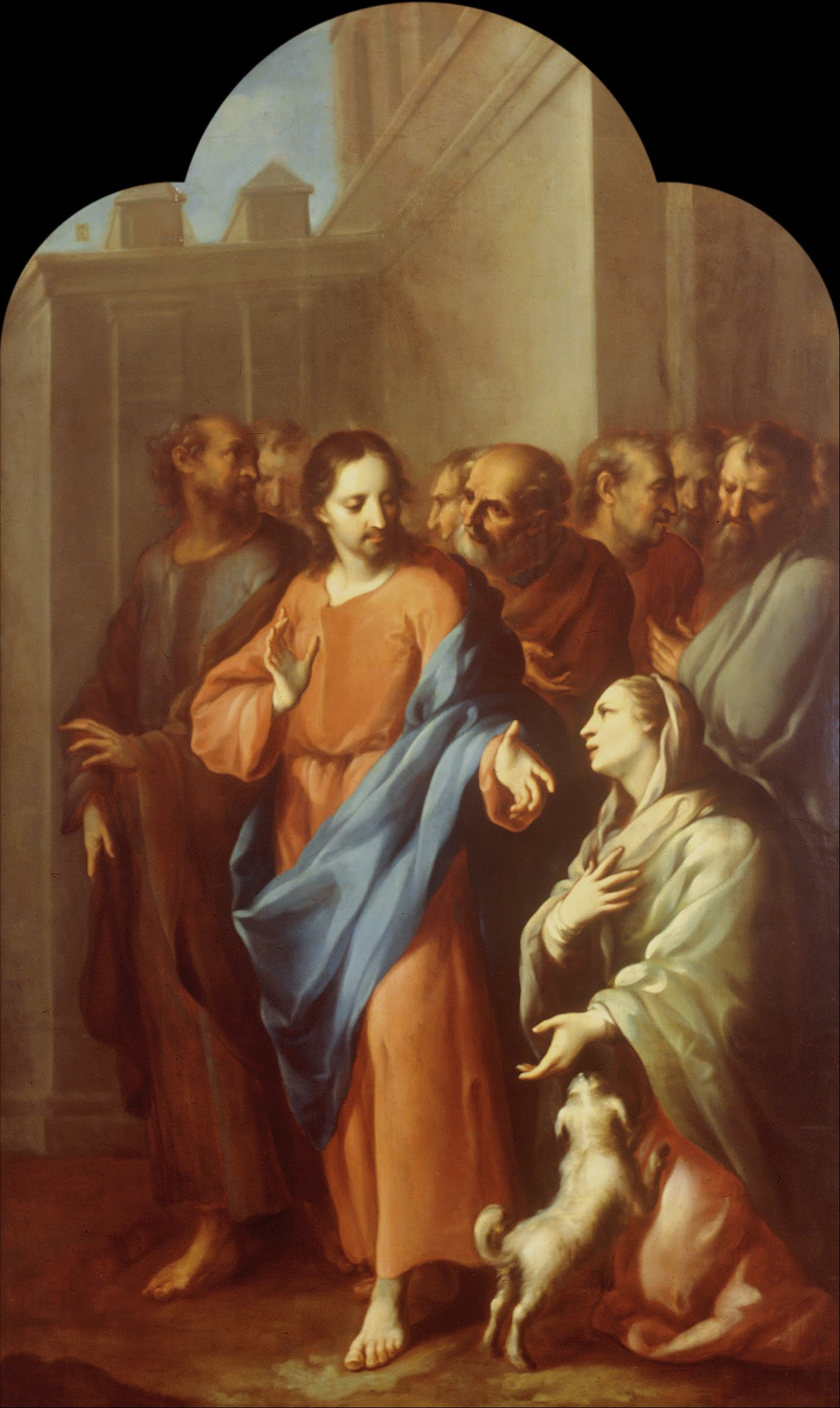
Jesús con la mujer enferma

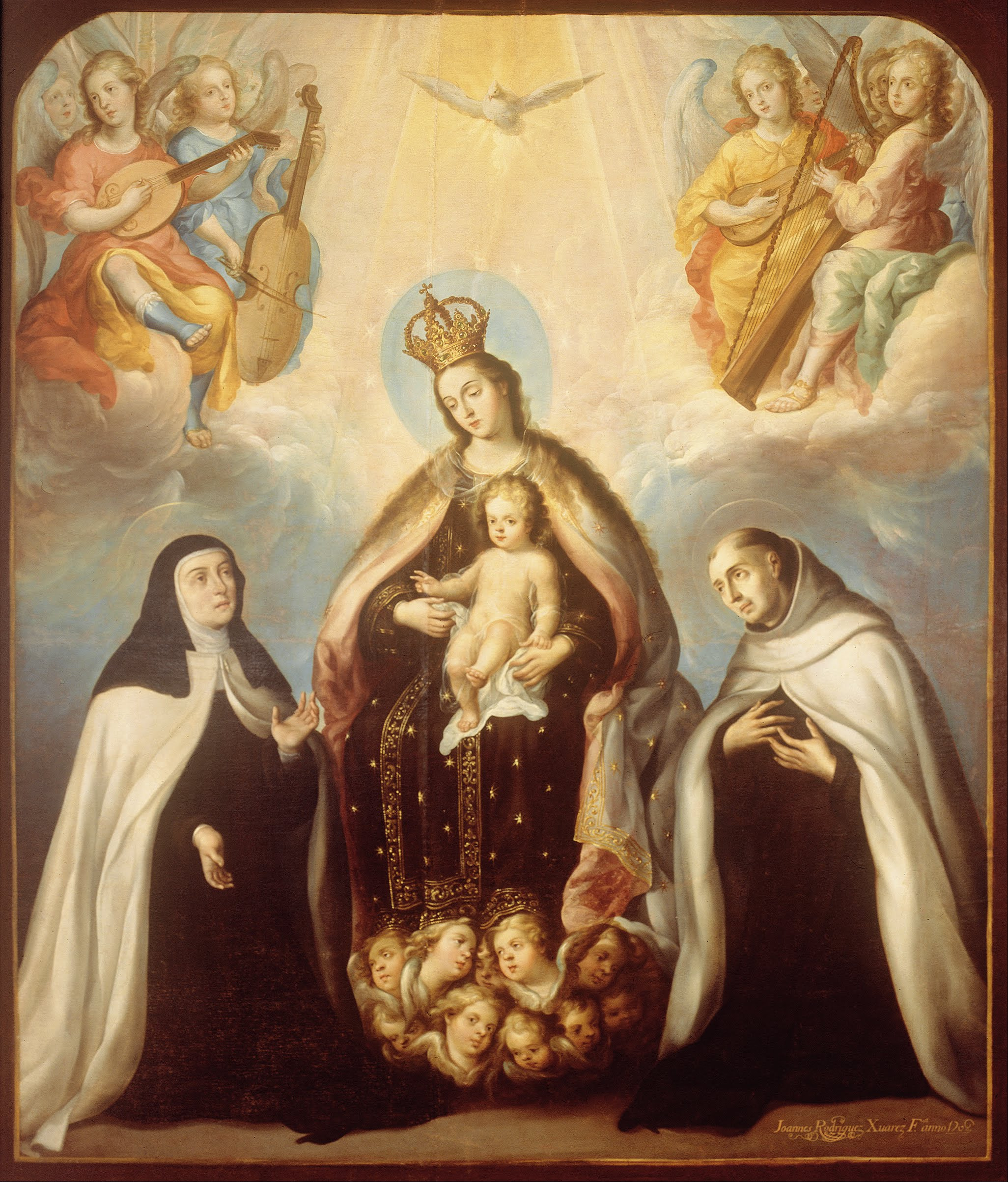
La virgen del Carmen con santa Teresa y san Juan de la Cruz

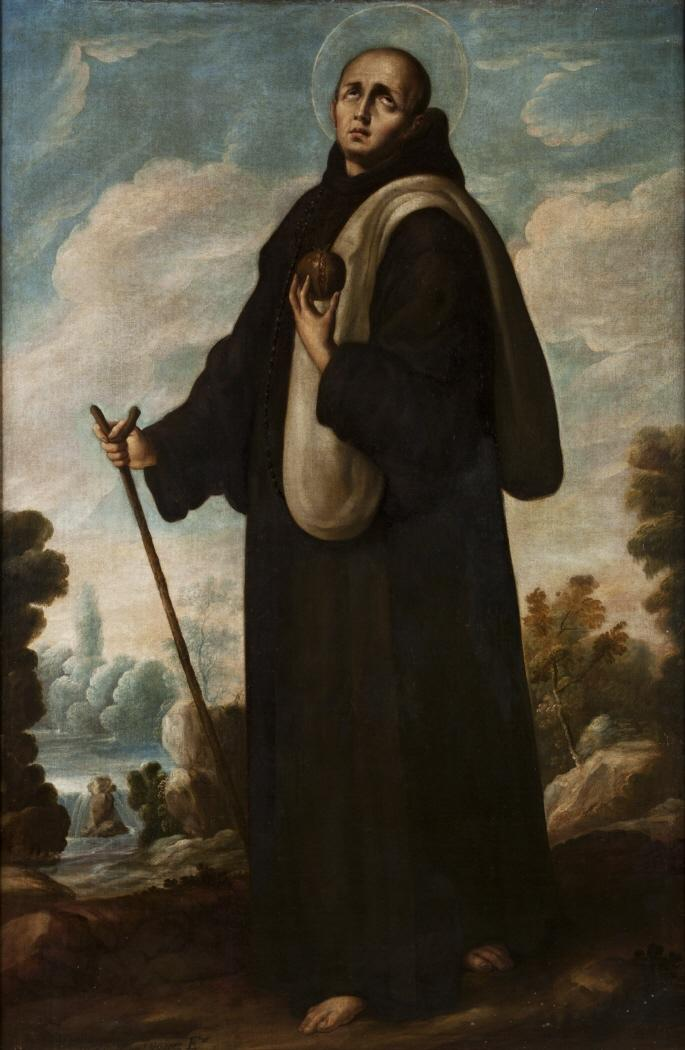
San Juan de Dios

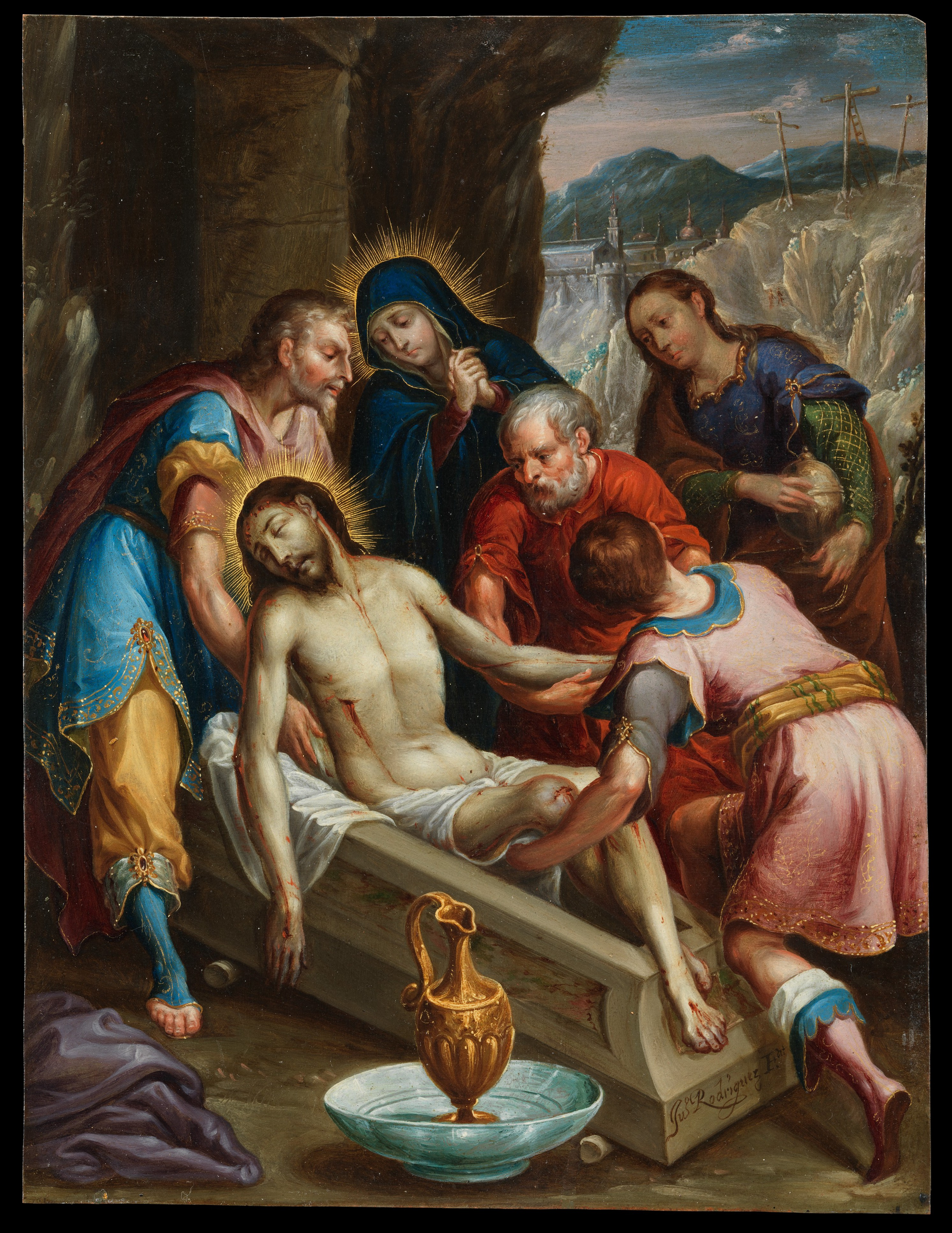
Entierro de Cristo, Oil and gold on copper 25.9 × 19.7 cm, Metropolitan Museum of Art, New York City, c. 1702.

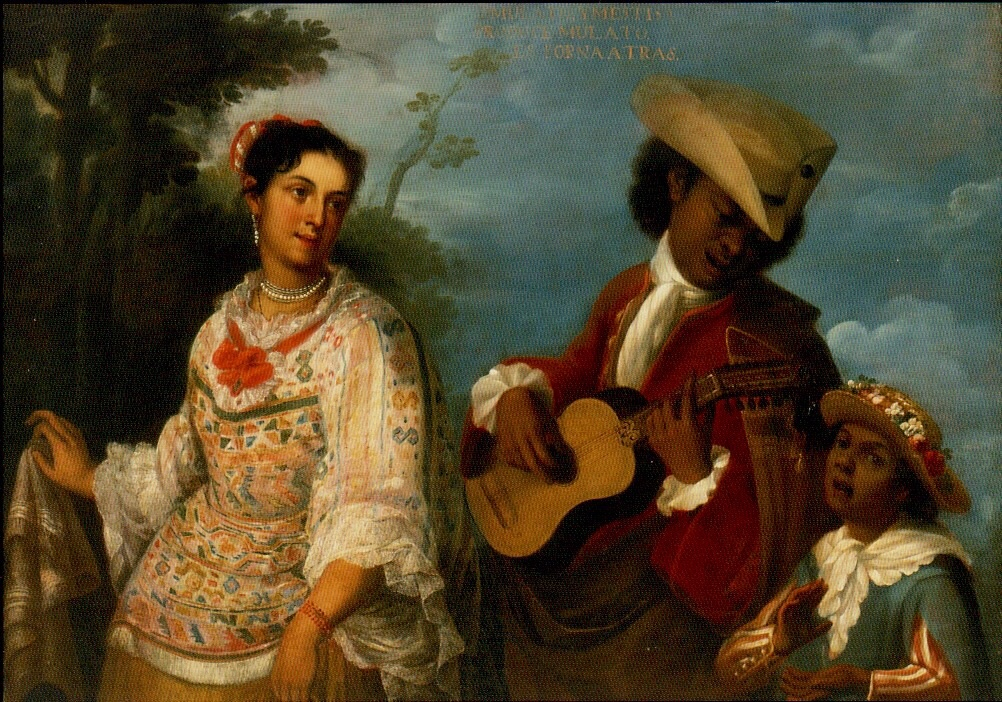
De mulato y mestiza, produce mulato, es torna atrás, ca. 1715

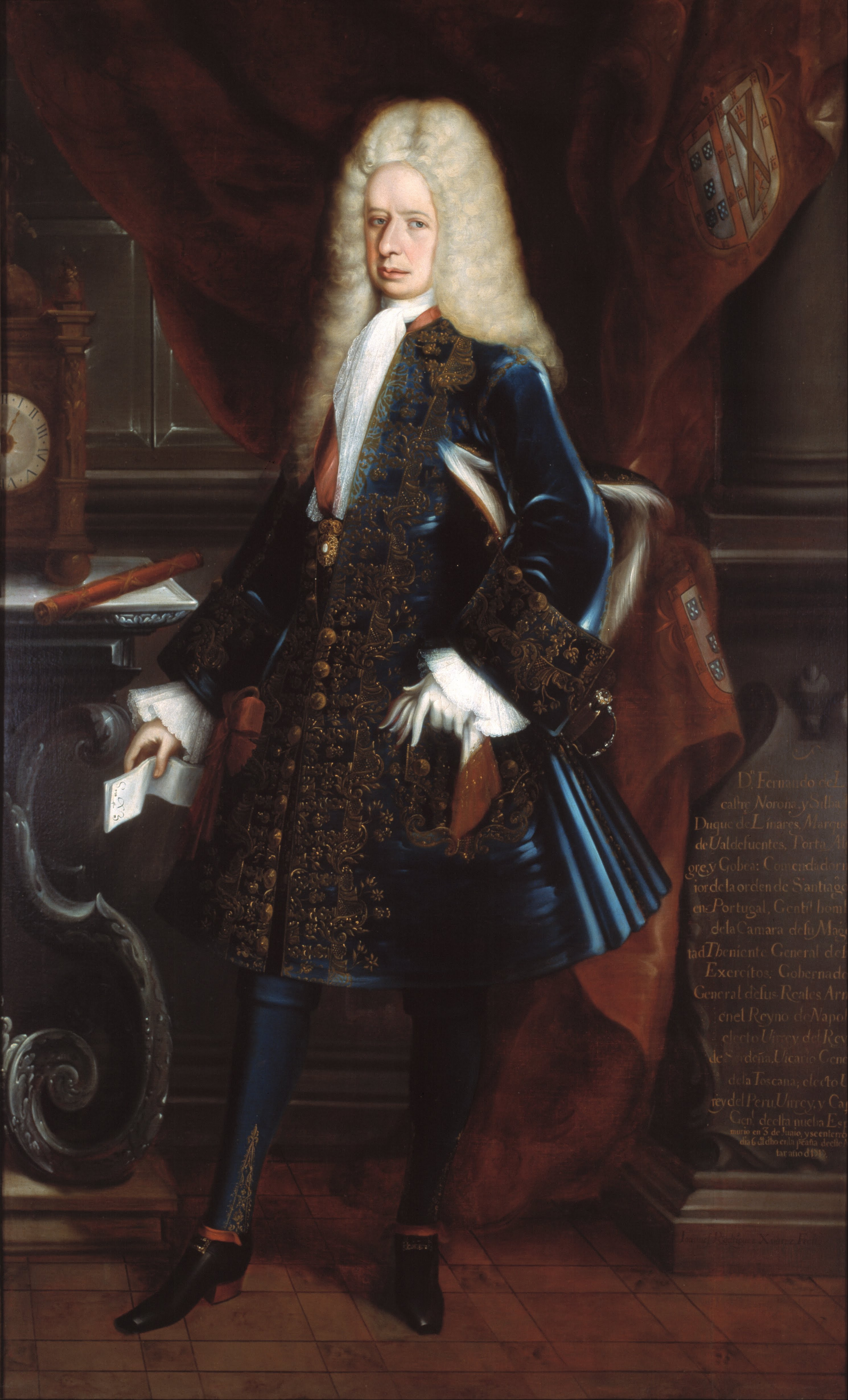
Portrait of Viceroy Fernando de Alencastre Noroña y Silva, duque de Linares y marqués de Valdefuentes, ca. 1717

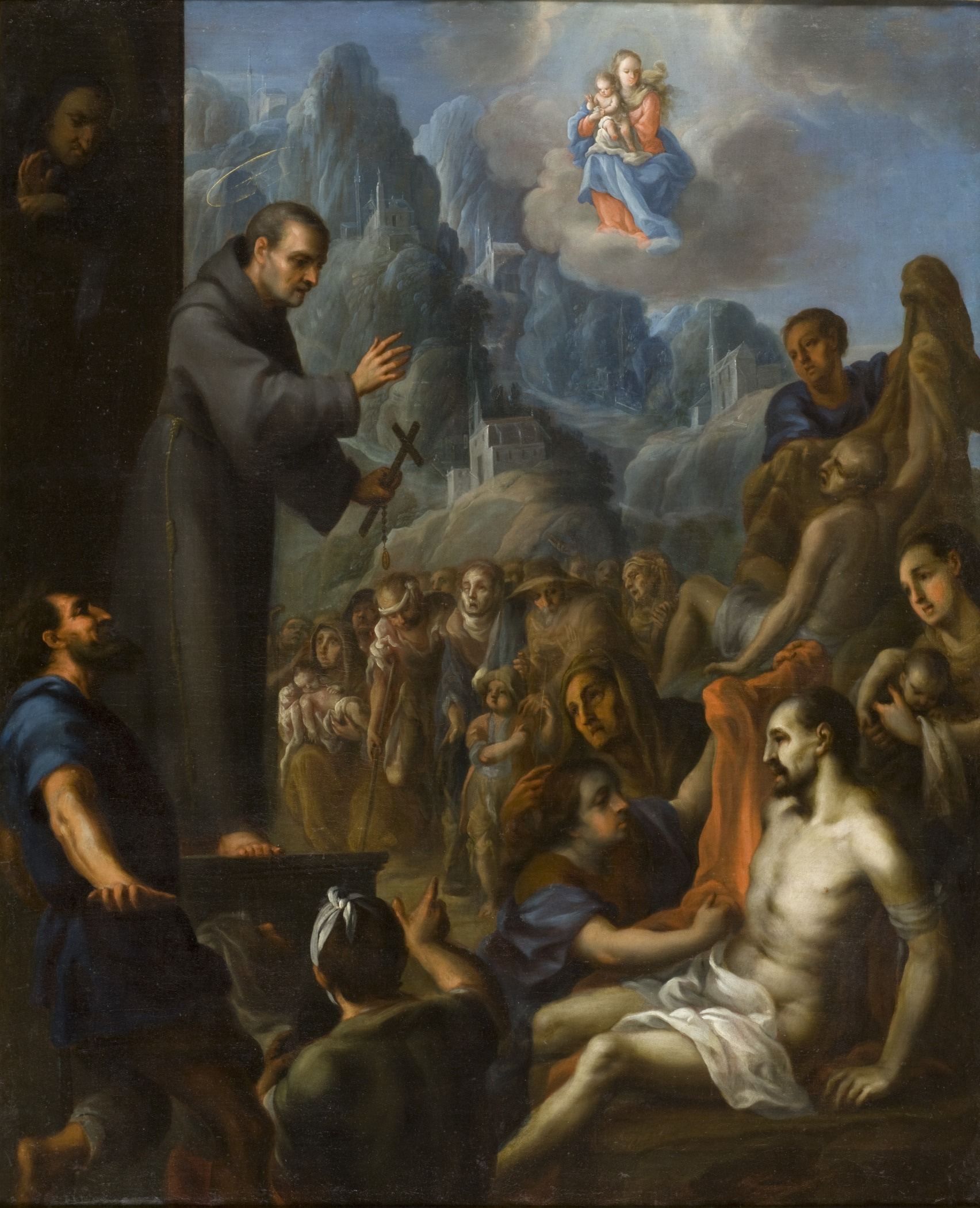
Milagros del beato Salvador de Horta, ca. 1720

== See also ==
- Mexican art
