= Mestizo =

Spanish term to indicate mixed ancestry

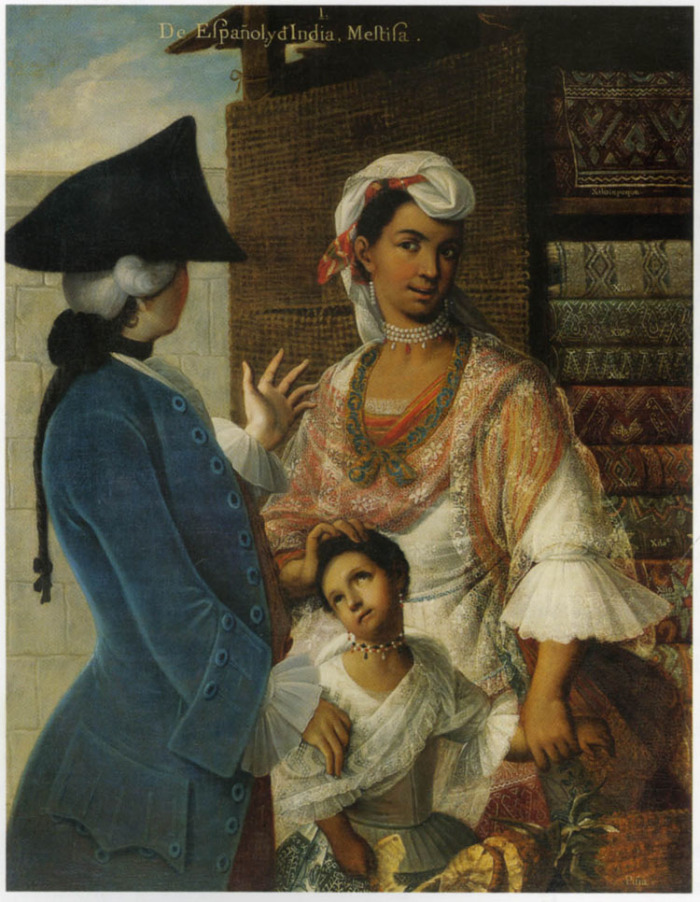
- A casta painting of a Spanish man and an Indigenous Mexican woman with their Mestizo child, c. 1763

Regions with significant populations
- Latin America, United States, Spain, Philippines

Languages
- Spanish (mainly), Indigenous languages of the Americas, Philippine languages

Religion
- Predominantly Roman Catholic; religious minorities including Protestants, syncretism with Native American beliefs, animism

Mestizo (Note: /mɛˈstiːzoʊ, mɪˈ-/ mest-EE-zoh, mist-) (Note: Spanish: [mesˈtiso] or [mesˈtiθo]; fem. mestiza, literally 'mixed person') (Spanish for "mixed person"), is an ethno-cultural category used primarily in the Hispanic world, or in any regions inheriting cultural influence from colonial Spain, to denote the people whose racial and/or cultural identity derive mostly from the miscegenation between Spanish and Native heritage. The term has historically been associated with Latin America, but it can also refer to other mixed-race peoples of partial Spanish descent that emerged during the Spanish colonial era, such as Filipino Mestizos. In some regions of the Spanish-speaking Americas, it may broadly refer to anyone who belongs to the culturally Hispanic majority, regardless of racial admixture or appearance. The term originated as a socio-ethnic category for the mixed-race castas that evolved in the colonies of the Spanish Empire. It was a formal label for individuals in official documents, such as censuses, parish registers, Inquisition trials, and others. Priests and royal officials might have classified persons as mestizos, but individuals also used the term in self-identification. With the Bourbon reforms and the independence of the Americas, the caste system disappeared and terms like "mestizo" fell in popularity.

The noun mestizaje, derived from the adjective mestizo, is a term for racial mixing that did not come into usage until the 20th century; it was not a colonial-era term. In the modern era, mestizaje is used by scholars such as Gloria Anzaldúa as a synonym for miscegenation, with positive connotations.

In the modern era, particularly in Latin America, mestizo has become more of a cultural term, with the term indio ('Indian') being reserved exclusively for people who have maintained a separate Indigenous ethnic and cultural identity, language, tribal affiliation, community engagement, etc. In late 19th- and early 20th-century Peru, for instance, mestizaje denoted those peoples with evidence of Euro-Indigenous ethno-racial "descent" and access—usually monetary access, but not always—to secondary educational institutions. Similarly, well before the 20th century, Euramerican "descent" did not necessarily denote Spanish American ancestry (distinct Portuguese administrative classification: mestiço), especially in Andean regions re-infrastructured by United States and European "modernities" and buffeted by mining labor practices. This conception changed by the 1920s, especially after the national advancement and cultural economics of indigenismo.

To avoid confusion with the original usage of the term mestizo, mixed people started to be referred to collectively as castas. In some Latin American countries, such as Mexico, the concept of the Mestizo became central to the formation of a new independent identity that was neither wholly Spanish nor wholly Indigenous. The word mestizo acquired another meaning in the 1930 census, being used by the government to refer to all Mexicans who did not speak Indigenous languages regardless of ancestry. In 20th- and 21st-century Peru, the nationalization of Quechuan languages and Aymaran languages as "official languages of the State...wherever they predominate" has increasingly severed these languages from mestizaje as an exonym (and, in certain cases, indio), with Indigenous languages tied to linguistic areas as well as topographical and geographical contexts. La sierra from the Altiplano to Huascarán, for instance, is more commonly connected to language families in both urban and rural vernacular.

Sorting society into racial categories was extremely important during the colonial period, in 1777, Georges-Louis Leclerc, Comte de Buffon created a paper identifying each type of race in the Americas, including that if a white person and an Native American had a child, it would be a mestizo.

During the colonial era of Mexico, the category Mestizo was used rather flexibly to register births in local parishes and its use did not follow any strict genealogical pattern. With Mexican independence, in academic circles created by the "mestizaje" or "Cosmic Race" ideology, scholars asserted that Mestizos are the result of the mixing of all the races. After the Mexican Revolution the government, in its attempts to create an unified Mexican identity with no racial distinctions, adopted and actively promoted the "mestizaje" ideology.

== Etymology ==
The Spanish word mestizo is from Latin mixticius, meaning 'mixed'. Its usage was documented as early as 1275, to refer to the offspring of an Egyptian ("Hamite") and a Canaanite Jew (Semite). This term was first documented in English in 1582.

=== Cognates and related terms ===
Mestizo (Spanish: [mesˈtiθo] or [mesˈtiso]), mestiço (Portuguese: [mɨʃˈtisu] or [mesˈtʃisu]), métis (French: [meti(s)]), mestís (Catalan: [məsˈtis]), Mischling (German: [ˈmɪʃlɪŋ]), meticcio (Italian: [meˈtittʃo]), mestiezen (Dutch: [mɛsˈtizə(n)]), mestee (Middle English: [məsˈtiː]), and mixed are all cognates of the Latin word mixticius.

The Portuguese cognate, mestiço, historically referred to any mixture of Portuguese and local populations in the Portuguese colonies. In colonial Brazil, most of the non-enslaved population was initially mestiço de indio, i.e. mixed Portuguese and Native Brazilian. There was no descent-based casta system, and children of upper-class Portuguese landlord males and enslaved females enjoyed privileges higher than those given to the lower classes, such as formal education. Such cases were not so common and the children of enslaved women tended not to be allowed to inherit property. This right of inheritance was generally given to children of free women, who tended to be legitimate offspring in cases of concubinage (this was a common practice in certain Indigenous American and African cultures). In the Portuguese-speaking world, the contemporary sense has been the closest to the historical usage from the Middle Ages. Because of important linguistic and historical differences, mestiço (mixed, mixed-ethnicity, miscegenation, etc.) is separated altogether from pardo (which refers to any kind of brown people) and caboclo (brown people originally of European–Indigenous American admixture, or assimilated Indigenous American). The term mestiços can also refer to fully African or East Asian in their full definition (thus not brown). One does not need to be a mestiço to be classified as pardo or caboclo.

In Brazil specifically, at least in modern times, all non-Indigenous people are considered to be a single ethnicity (os brasileiros. Lines between ethnic groups are historically fluid); since the earliest years of the Brazilian colony, the mestiço group has been the most numerous among the free people. As explained above, the concept of mestiço should not be confused with mestizo as used in either the Spanish-speaking world or the English-speaking one. It does not relate to being of Indigenous American ancestry, and is not used interchangeably with pardo, literally "brown people". (There are mestiços among all major groups of the country: Indigenous, Asian, pardo, and African, and they likely constitute the majority in the three latter groups.)

In English-speaking Canada, Canadian Métis (capitalized), as a loanword from French, refers to persons of mixed French or European and Indigenous ancestry, who were part of a particular ethnic group. French-speaking Canadians, when using the word métis, are referring to Canadian Métis ethnicity, and all persons of mixed Indigenous and European ancestry. Many were involved in the fur trade with Canadian First Nations peoples (especially Cree and Anishinaabeg). Over generations, they developed a separate culture of hunters and trappers, and were concentrated in the Red River Valley and speak the Michif language.

== Mestizo as a colonial-era category ==
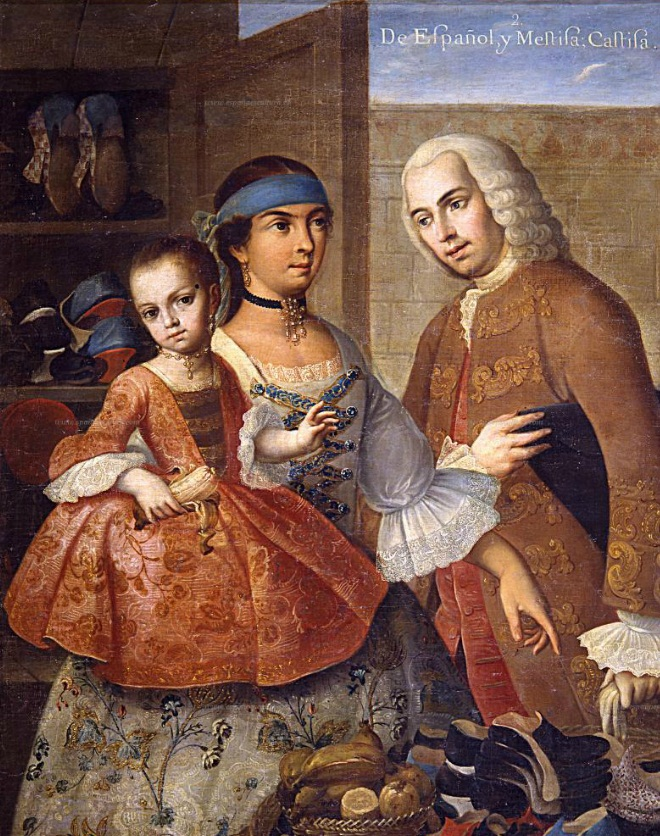
A casta painting by Miguel Cabrera. Here he shows a Spanish (español) father, Mestiza (mixed Spanish–American Indian) mother, and their Castiza daughter.

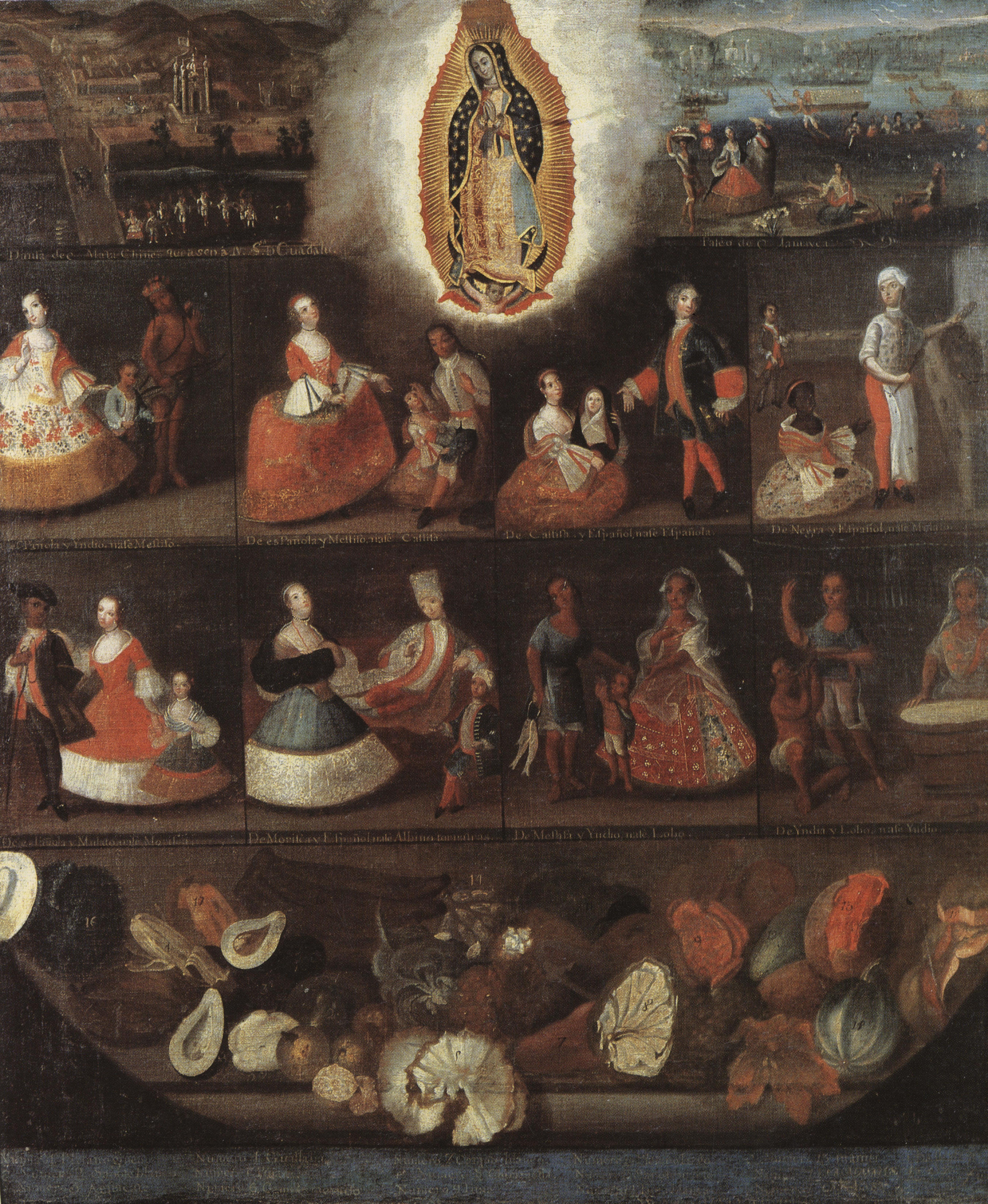
Luis de Mena, Virgin of Guadalupe and castas, 1750. The top left grouping is of an indio and an española, with their Mestizo son. This is the only known casta painting with an indio man and española woman.

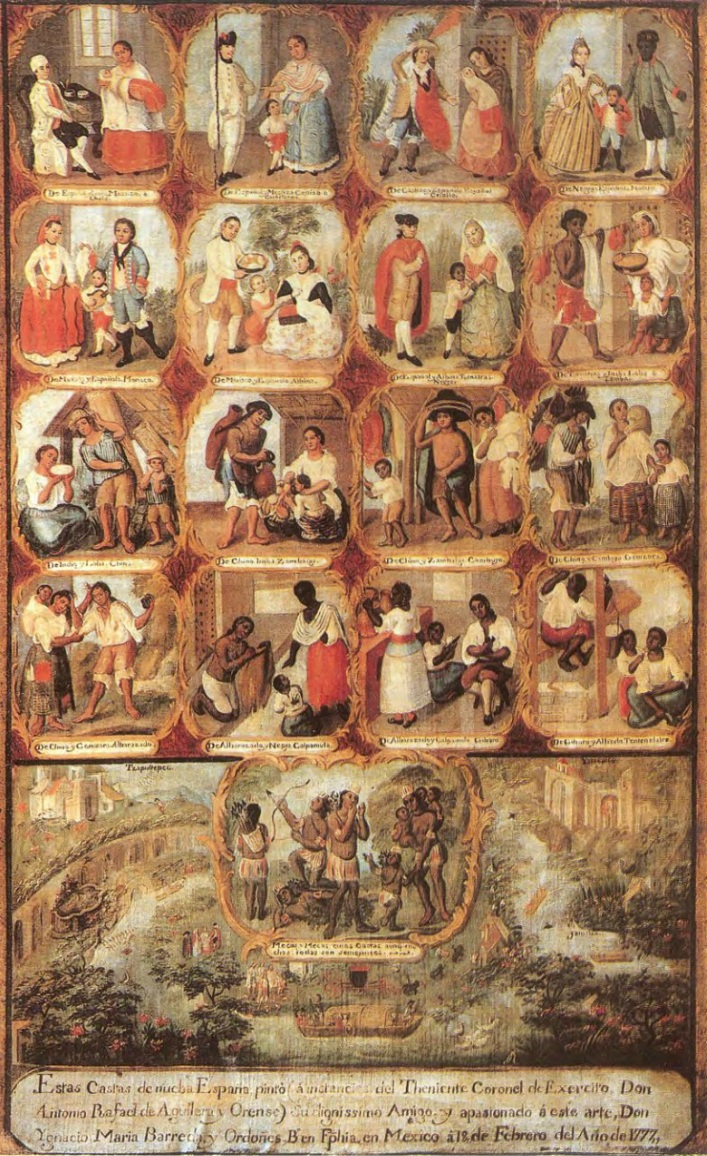
Casta painting showing 16 hierarchically arranged, mixed-race groupings. The top left grouping uses cholo as a synonym for mestizo. Ignacio Maria Barreda, 1777. Real Academia Española de la Lengua, Madrid.

In the Spanish colonial period, the Spanish developed a complex set of racial terms and ways to describe difference. Although this has been conceived of as a "system", and often called the sistema de castas or sociedad de castas, archival research shows that racial labels were not fixed throughout a person's life. Artwork created mainly in eighteenth-century Mexico, "casta paintings", show groupings of racial types in hierarchical order, which has influenced the way that modern scholars have conceived of social difference in Spanish America.

During the initial period of colonization of the Americas by the Spanish, there were three chief categories of ethnicities: Spaniard (español), American Indian (indio), and African (negro). Throughout the territories of the Spanish Empire in the Americas, ways of differentiating individuals in a racial hierarchy, often called in the modern era the sistema de castas or the sociedad de castas, developed where society was divided based on color, calidad (status), and other factors.

The main divisions were as follows:

1. Español (fem. española), i.e. Spaniard – person of Spanish ancestry; a blanket term, subdivided into Peninsulares and Criollos
  - Peninsular – a person of Spanish descent born in Spain who later settled in the Americas;
  - Criollo (fem. criolla) – a person of Spanish descent born in the Americas;
2. Castizo (fem. castiza) – a person with primarily Spanish and some American Indian ancestry born into a mixed family.
3. Mestizo (fem. mestiza) – a person of mixed Spanish and American Indian ancestry;
4. Indio (fem. India) – a person of pure American Indian ancestry;
5. Pardo (fem. parda) – a person of mixed Spanish, Amerindian and African ancestry; sometimes a polite term for a black person;
6. Mulatto (fem. mulatta) – a person of mixed Spanish and African ancestry;
7. Zambo – a person of mixed African and American Indian ancestry;
8. Negro (fem. negra) – a person of African descent, primarily former enslaved Africans and their descendants.

In theory, and as depicted in some eighteenth-century Mexican casta paintings, the offspring of a castizo/a [mixed Spanish – Mestizo] and an Español/a could be considered Español/a, or "returned" to that status.

Racial labels in a set of eighteenth-century Mexican casta paintings by Miguel Cabrera:

- De Español e India, nace Mestiza
- De Español y Mestiza, nace Castiza
- De Castizo y Española, nace Española
- De Español y Negra, nace Mulata
- De Español y Mulata, nace Morisca
- De Español y Morisca, nace Albino
- De Español y Albina, nace Torna atrás
- De Español y Torna atrás, "Tente en el ayre"
- De Negro y India, Chino Cambuja
- De Chino Cambujo y India, Loba
- De Lobo y India, Albarazado
- De Albarazado y Mestiza, Barcino
- De Indio y Barcina, Zambaiga
- De Castizo y Mestiza, Chamizo
- Indios Gentiles (Barbarian Meco Indians)

Policies endorsing mestizaje were undertaken by the crown of Spain since 1503, when governor Nicolás de Ovando received royal orders to increase intermarrying. It was reiterated in a real cédula in 1514. In the early colonial period, the children of Spaniards and American Indians were raised either in the Hispanic world, if the father recognized the offspring as his natural child; or the child was raised in the Indigenous world of the mother if he did not. As early as 1533, Charles V mandated the high court (Audiencia) to take the children of Spanish men and indigenous women from their mothers and educate them in the Spanish sphere. Miguel Díez de Aux, the first mestizo documented in history, was among those raised by their Spanish fathers. The mixed group born out of Christian wedlock also increased in numbers, generally living in their mother's Indigenous communities.

Mestizos were the first group in the colonial era to be designated as a separate category from the Spanish (Españoles) and enslaved African blacks (Negros) and were included in the designation of "vagabonds" (vagabundos) in 1543 in Mexico. Although Mestizos were often classified as castas, they had a higher standing than any mixed-race person since they did not have to pay tribute, the men could be ordained as priests, and they could be licensed to carry weapons, in contrast to negros, mulattoes, and other castas. Unlike Blacks and mulattoes, Mestizos had no African ancestors. Intermarriage between Españoles and Mestizos resulted in offspring designated Castizos ("three-quarters white"), and the marriage of a castizo/a to an Español/a resulted in the restoration of Español/a status to the offspring. Don Alonso O'Crouley observed in Mexico (1774): "If the mixed-blood is the offspring of a Spaniard and an Indian, the stigma [of race mixture] disappears at the third step in descent because it is held as systematic that a Spaniard and an Indian produce a mestizo; a mestizo and a Spaniard, a castizo; and a castizo and a Spaniard, a Spaniard. The admixture of Indian blood should not indeed be regarded as a blemish, since the provisions of law give the Indian all that he could wish for, and Philip II granted to mestizos the privilege of becoming priests. On this consideration is based the common estimation of descent from a union of Indian and European or creole Spaniard." O'Crouley states that the same process of restoration of racial purity does not occur over generations for European-African offspring marrying whites. "From the union of a Spaniard and a Negro the mixed-blood retains the stigma for generations without losing the original quality of a mulato."

The Spanish colonial regime divided groups into two basic legal categories, the Republic of Indians (República de Indios) and the Republic of Spaniards (República de Españoles) comprised the Spanish (Españoles) and all other non-Indian peoples. Indians were free vassals of the crown, whose commoners paid tribute while Indigenous elites were considered nobles and tribute exempt, as were Mestizos. Indians were nominally protected by the crown, with non-Indians (Mestizos, blacks, and mulattoes) forbidden to live in Indigenous communities. Mestizos and Indians in Mexico habitually held each other in mutual antipathy. This was particularly the case with commoner American Indians against Mestizos, some of whom infiltrated their communities and became part of the ruling elite. Spanish authorities turned a blind eye to the Mestizos' presence, since they collected commoners' tribute for the crown and came to hold offices. They were useful intermediaries for the colonial state between the Republic of Spaniards and the Republic of Indians.

A person's legal racial classification in colonial Spanish America was closely tied to social status, wealth, culture, and language use. Wealthy people paid to change or obscure their actual ancestry. Many Indigenous people left their traditional villages and sought to be counted as Mestizos to avoid tribute payments to the Spanish. Many Indigenous people, and sometimes those with partial African descent, were classified as Mestizo if they spoke Spanish and lived as Mestizos.

In colonial Venezuela, pardo was more commonly used instead of mestizo. Pardo means being mixed without specifying which mixture; it was used to describe anyone born in the Americas whose ancestry was a mixture of European, Native American, and African.

When the First Mexican Republic was established in 1824, legal racial categories ceased to exist. The production of casta paintings in New Spain ceased at the same juncture, after almost a century as a genre.

Because the term had taken on a myriad of meanings, the designation "Mestizo" was actively removed from census counts in Mexico and is no longer in official nor governmental use.

== Percentage and genetic admixture by country in the Americas ==
Percent identified as Mestizo or other mixed race		Genetic admixture of the general population (not accurate) according to Fuerst and Kirkegaard (2016)		
Country	%	European	Amerindian	Sub-Saharan African
Honduras	90%	40%	38%	22%
El Salvador	86.3%	15%	75%	10%
Ecuador	85.2% (including the montubios 7.7%)	42%	52%	6%
Paraguay	75%	55%	37%	8%
Dominican Republic	71.7%	45%	15%	40%
Nicaragua	69%	57%	23%	20%
Bolivia	68%	20%	78%	2%
Panama	65%	25%	36%	39%
Peru	60.2%	12%	81%	7%
Guatemala	56%	40%	53%	7%
Belize	52.9%	25%	38%	37%
Venezuela	51.6%	56%	25%	19%
Puerto Rico	49.8%	64%	15%	21%
Colombia	49%–60%	62.9%	28%	9.09%
Brazil	45.3%	71%	10%	19%
Chile	44%	58%	39%	3%
Mexico	40%–90%	45%	50%	5%
Cuba	26.6%	71%	8%	21%
Costa Rica	24.5%	49%	31%	20%
Argentina	11.4%	78%	20%	2%
United States	10.2%	79%	7%	14%
Uruguay	2.4%	83%	8%	9%

== Spanish-speaking North America ==
=== Mexico ===
Around 40–90% of Mexicans can be classified as "mestizos", meaning in modern Mexican usage that they identify fully neither with any European heritage nor with an Indigenous ethnic group, but rather identify as having cultural traits incorporating both European and Indigenous elements. In Mexico, mestizo has become a blanket term that not only refers to mixed Mexicans but includes all Mexican citizens who do not speak Indigenous languages

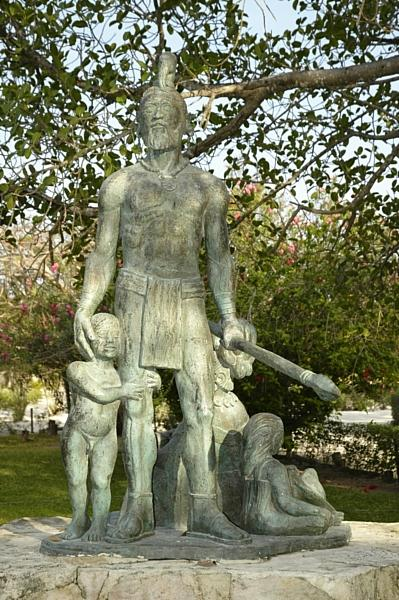
A statue of Gonzalo Guerrero, who adopted the Maya way of life and fathered the first mestizo children in Mexico and in the mainland Americas (the only mestizos before were those born in the Caribbean to Spanish men and Indigenous Caribbean women)

Sometimes, particularly outside of Mexico, the word "mestizo" is used with the meaning of Mexican persons with mixed Indigenous and European blood. This usage does not conform to the Mexican social reality where a person of pure Indigenous ancestry would be considered mestizo either by rejecting his Indigenous culture or by not speaking an Indigenous language, and a person with none or very low Indigenous ancestry would be considered Indigenous either by speaking an Indigenous language or by identifying with a particular Indigenous cultural heritage. In the Yucatán Peninsula, the word mestizo has a different meaning to the one used in the rest of Mexico, being used to refer to the Maya-speaking populations living in traditional communities, because during the Caste War of Yucatán of the late 19th century those Maya who did not join the rebellion were classified as mestizos. In Chiapas, the term Ladino is used instead of Mestizo.

Due to the extensiveness of the modern definition of mestizo, various publications offer different estimations of this group, some try to use a biological, racial perspective and calculate the mestizo population in contemporary Mexico as being around a half and two-thirds of the population, while others use the culture-based definition, and estimate the percentage of mestizos as high as 90% of the Mexican population, several others mix-up both due lack of knowledge in regards to the modern definition and assert that mixed ethnicity Mexicans are as much as 93% of Mexico's population. Paradoxically to its wide definition, the word mestizo has long been dropped off popular Mexican vocabulary, with the word sometimes having pejorative connotations, which further complicates attempts to quantify mestizos via self-identification.

While for most of its history the concept of mestizo and mestizaje has been lauded by Mexico's intellectual circles, in recent times the concept has been a target of criticism, with its detractors claiming that it delegitimizes the importance of ethnicity in Mexico under the idea of "(racism) not existing here (in Mexico), as everybody is mestizo". Anthropologist Federico Navarrete concludes that reintroducing racial classification, and accepting itself as a multicultural country, as opposed to a monolithic mestizo country, would bring benefits to Mexican society as a whole.

==== Genetic studies ====
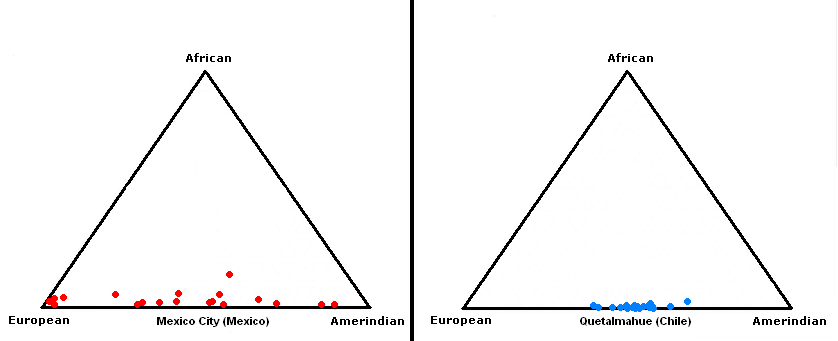
Distribution of admixture estimates for individuals from Mexico City (left) and Quetalmahue, Chile (right). The position of each dot on the triangle plot indicates the proportion of European, indigenous American and African ancestry estimated for each individual in the population.

A 2012 study published by the Journal of Human Genetics found that the Y-chromosome (paternal) ancestry of the average Mexican mestizo was predominantly European (64.9%), followed by Indigenous American (30.8%), and African (4.2%). The European ancestry was more prevalent in the north and west (66.7–95%) and Indigenous American ancestry increased in the centre and south-east (37–50%), the African ancestry was low and relatively homogeneous (0–8.8%). The states that participated in this study were Aguascalientes, Chiapas, Chihuahua, Durango, Guerrero, Jalisco, Oaxaca, Sinaloa, Veracruz and Yucatán.

An older study of 104 mestizos from Sonora, Yucatán, Guerrero, Zacatecas, Veracruz, and Guanajuato by Mexico's National Institute of Genomic Medicine, using "Asian" ancestry as a proxy for Indigenous American admixture, reported that mestizo Mexicans are 58.96% European, 31.05% "Asian" (Indigenous American), and 10.03% African. Sonora shows the highest European contribution (70.63%) and Guerrero the lowest (51.98%) which also has the highest "Asian" contribution (37.17%). African contribution ranges from 2.8% in Sonora to 11.13% in Veracruz. 80% of the Mexican population was classed as mestizo (defined as "being racially mixed in some degree").

In May 2009, the same institution (Mexico's National Institute of Genomic Medicine) issued an updated report on a genomic study of 300 mestizos from those same states, this time using Indigenous American samples to represent Indigenous admixture, rather than an East Asian proxy population. The study found that the mestizo population of these Mexican states were on average 55% of Indigenous ancestry followed by 41.8% of European, 1.8% of African, and 1.2% of East Asian ancestry. The study also noted that whereas mestizo individuals from the southern state of Guerrero showed on average 66% of Indigenous ancestry, those from the northern state of Sonora displayed about 61.6% European ancestry. The study found that there was an increase in Indigenous ancestry as one traveled towards to the Southern states in Mexico, while the Indigenous ancestry declined as one traveled to the Northern states in the country, such as Sonora.

=== Central America ===
The Ladino people are a mix of Mestizo or Hispanicized peoples in Latin America, principally in Central America. The demonym Ladino is a Spanish word that derives from Latino. Ladino is an exonym dating to the colonial era to refer to those Spanish-speakers who were not colonial elites (Peninsulares and Criollos), or Indigenous peoples.

==== Honduras ====
In Honduras, 86.6% of the population identify as mestizo. Originally mestizo was a person with Indigenous and European ancestry, however, in recent years, the term also includes people with African ancestry.

The colonial period created a caste system, based on color, and the closer a person was to white, the better they are. This led to darker-skinned people, especially women, being taken advantage of, and it led to a boom in the mixed-raced population, however, as time went on, this caste system collapsed and left colorism in its place.

During the 20th Century, Honduras made it a point to unify the country under the term mestizo, so in official government reports, Honduras was referred to as mestizo Honduras. However, it was not always this unified, racial tensions between black immigrants from the West Indies and the mestizos from Honduras erupted in the early 20th century, due to job competition. The Honduran government created different racial categories in the hopes of quelling these tensions, and in the 1930s, there was a movement that advocated for Hondurans to embrace their indigenous roots, and the government declared that the majority of the population had indigenous ancestors, and mestizo was applied to the country.

However, unifying the country under mestizos did not get rid of racism, instead colorism is rampant, for example, an Afro-Honduran soccer player experienced discrimination based on the fact that his skin tone was dark.

==== Costa Rica ====
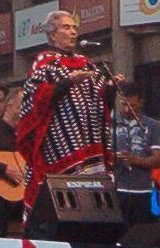
Chavela Vargas Mixed-Costa Rican Born – Singer

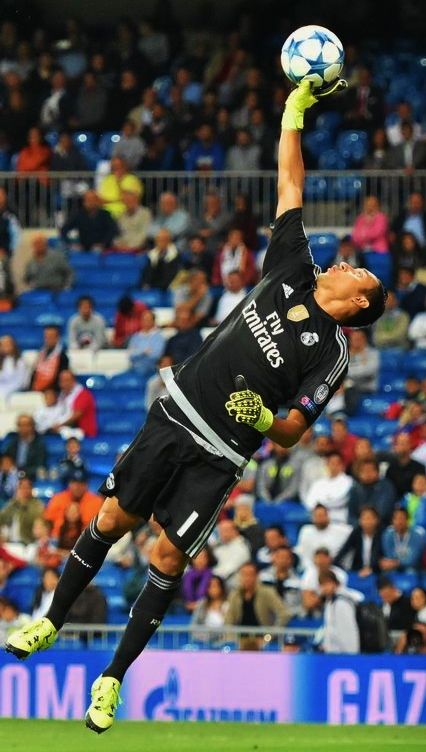
Keylor Navas Mixed-Costa Rican – Real Madrid Goalkeeper

As of 2012, most Costa Ricans are primarily of Spanish or mestizo ancestry with minorities of German, Italian, Jamaican, and Greek ancestry.

European migrants used Costa Rica to get across the isthmus of Central America as well to reach the U.S. West Coast (California) in the late 19th century and until the 1910s (before the Panama Canal opened). Other ethnic groups known to live in Costa Rica include Nicaraguan, Colombians, Venezuelans, Peruvian, Brazilians, Portuguese, Palestinians, Caribbeans, Turks, Armenians, and Georgians.

Costa Rica has four small minority groups: Mulattos, Afro, Indigenous Costa Ricas, and Asians. About 8% of the population is of African descent or mulatto (mix of European and African) who are called Afro-Costa Ricans, English-speaking descendants of 19th century Afro-Jamaican immigrant workers.

By the late 20th century, allusions in textbooks and political discourse to "whiteness", or to Spain as the "mother country" of all Costa Ricans, were diminishing, replaced with a recognition of the multiplicity of peoples that make up the nation.

==== El Salvador ====
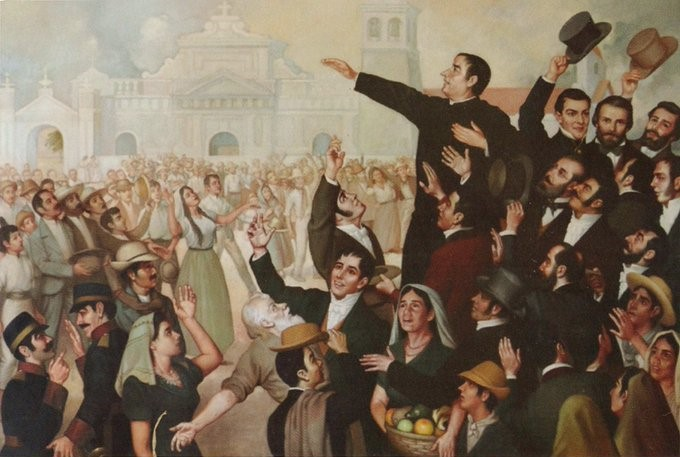
Painting of the First Independence Movement celebration in San Salvador, El Salvador. At the center, José Matías Delgado, a Salvadoran priest and doctor known as El Padre de la Patria Salvadoreña (The Father of the Salvadoran Fatherland), alongside his nephew Manuel José Arce, future Salvadoran president of the Federal Republic of Central America.

In Central America, intermarriage between European men and Indigenous women, typically of Lenca, and Pipil backgrounds in what is now El Salvador happened almost immediately after the arrival of the Spaniards led by Pedro de Alvarado. Other Indigenous groups in the country such as Maya Poqomam people, Maya Ch'orti' people, Alaguilac, Xinca people, Mixe and Mangue language people became culturally extinct due to the mestizo process or diseases brought by the Spaniards. Mestizo culture quickly became the most successful and dominant culture in El Salvador. The majority of Salvadorans in modern El Salvador identify themselves as 86.3% Mestizo roots.

Historical evidence and census supports the explanation of "strong sexual asymmetry", as a result of a strong bias favoring children born to European men and Indigenous women, and to the important Indigenous male mortality during the conquest. The genetics thus suggests the Native men were sharply reduced in numbers due to the war and disease. Large numbers of Spaniard men settled in the region and married or forced themselves with the local women. The Natives were forced to adopt Spanish names, language, and religion, and in this way, the Lencas and Pipil women and children were Hispanicized. This has made El Salvador one of the world's most highly mixed race nations.

In 1932, ruthless dictator Maximiliano Hernández Martínez was responsible for La Matanza ("The Slaughter"), known as the 1932 Salvadoran peasant massacre in which the Indigenous people were murdered in an effort to wipe out the Indigenous people in El Salvador during the 1932 Salvadoran peasant uprising. Indigenous peoples, mostly of Lenca, Cacaopera, and Pipil descent are still present in El Salvador in several communities, conserving their languages, customs, and traditions.

There is a significant Arab population (of about 100,000), mostly from Palestine (especially from the area of Bethlehem), but also from Lebanon. Salvadorans of Palestinian descent numbered around 70,000 individuals, while Salvadorans of Lebanese descent is around 27,000. There is also a small community of Jews who came to El Salvador from France, Germany, Morocco, Tunisia, and Turkey. Many of these Arab groups naturally mixed and contributed into the modern Salvadoran Mestizo population.

Pardo is the term that was used in colonial El Salvador to describe a person of tri-racial or Indigenous, European, and African descent. El Salvador is the only country in Central America that does not have a significant African population due to many factors including El Salvador not having a Caribbean coast, and because of president Maximiliano Hernández Martínez, who passed racial laws to keep people of African descent and others out of El Salvador, though Salvadorans with African ancestry, called Pardos, were already present in El Salvador, the majority are tri-racial Pardo Salvadorans who largely cluster with the Mestizo population. They have been mixed into and were naturally bred out by the general Mestizo population, which is a combination of a Mestizo majority and the minority of Pardo people, both of whom are racially mixed populations. A total of only 10,000 enslaved Africans were brought to El Salvador over the span of 75 years, starting around 1548, about 25 years after El Salvador's colonization. The enslaved Africans that were brought to El Salvador during the colonial times, eventually came to mix and merged into the much larger and vaster Mestizo mixed European Spanish/Native Indigenous population creating Pardo or Afromestizos who cluster with Mestizo people, contributing into the modern day Mestizo population in El Salvador, thus, there remains no significant extremes of African physiognomy among Salvadorans like there is in the other countries of Central America.

Today, many Salvadorans identify themselves as being culturally part of the majority Salvadoran mestizo population, even if they are racially European (especially Mediterranean), as well as Indigenous people in El Salvador who do not speak Indigenous languages nor have an Indigenous culture, and tri-racial/pardo Salvadorans or Arab Salvadorans.

==== Guatemala ====
The Ladino population in Guatemala is officially recognized as a distinct ethnic group, and the Ministry of Education of Guatemala uses the following definition:

The Ladino population has been characterized as a heterogeneous population which expresses itself in the Spanish language as a maternal language, which possesses specific cultural traits of Hispanic origin mixed with Indigenous cultural elements, and dresses in a style commonly considered as western.

== Spanish-speaking South America ==
=== Argentina and Uruguay ===
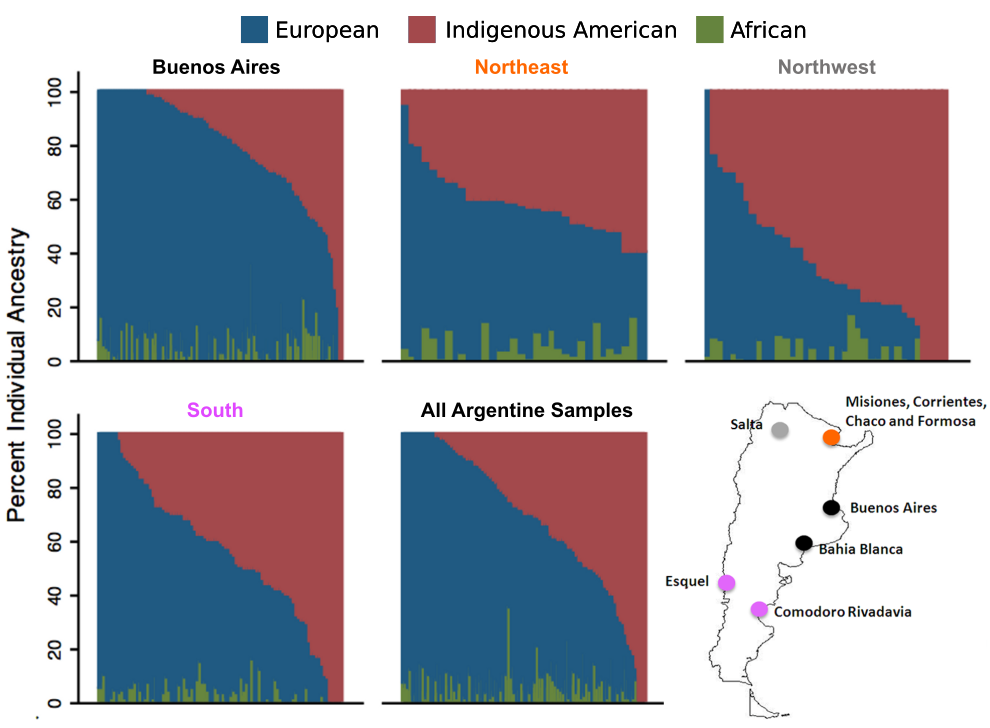
Distribution of genetic ancestry among 441 individuals from Argentina by four major regions.

Initially colonial Argentina and Uruguay had a predominantly mestizo population like the rest of the Spanish colonies, but due to a flood of continuous European migration waves in the 19th and early 20th centuries and the repeated intermarriage with Europeans, most of them coming from Italy and Spain, this intensified the European influence on culture and society in Argentina and Uruguay. As a result, the Mestizo population became a so-called Castizo population. As a result, the term Mestizo has seen a decrease in use. Nevertheless, the cultural practice of the region is commonly centred on the figure of the Gaucho, which intrinsically mixes European and native traditions.

Argentine Northwest still has an important mestizo population, especially in the provinces of Jujuy and Salta. Aside from that, the Mestizo component of Argentina has seen a resurge following the arrival of Mestizo immigrants primarily coming from Bolivia, Paraguay and Peru since the late 20th and early 21st century and their descendants living in the capital Buenos Aires, the Province of Buenos Aires or throughout the country, with important concentrations on the border regions with Bolivia and Paraguay.

=== Chile ===
The Chilean race, as everybody knows, is a Mestizo race made of Spanish conquistadors and the Araucanian...

— Nicolás Palacios in La raza chilena (1904).

In Chile, from the time the Spanish soldiers with Pedro de Valdivia entered northern Chile, a process of 'mestizaje' began where Spaniards began to intermarry and reproduce with the local bellicose Mapuche population of Indigenous Chileans to produce an overwhelmingly mestizo population during the first generation in all of the cities they founded. According to Nicolas Palacios, Chilean mestizo or the Chilean race is a mixture of two bellicose master races: the Visigoths of Spain and the Mapuche. In Southern Chile, the Mapuche, were one of the only Indigenous tribes in the Americas that were in continuous conflict with the Spanish Empire and did not submit to a European power. But because Southern Chile was settled by German settlers in 1848, many mestizos include descendants of Mapuche and German settlers.

A public health book from the University of Chile states that 60% of the population is of only European origin; mestizos are estimated to amount to a total of 35%, while Indigenous peoples comprise the remaining 5%. A genetic study by the same university showed that the average Chilean's genes in the Mestizo segment are 60% European and 40% Indigenous American. Chile was formerly mestizo majority, but was reduced because of continuous migration and settlement of European settlers of mostly Spanish and German origin in the 19th and 20th centuries and frequent intermarriage with mestizos, until the mestizo majority in Chile became castizo majority.

As Easter Island is a territory of Chile and the native settlers are Rapa Nui, descendants of intermarriages of European Chileans (mostly Spanish) and Rapa Nui are even considered by Chilean law as mestizos (even by the whole Spanish-speaking world).

=== Colombia ===
Genetic ancestry of Mestizo Colombians according to Rojas et al (2010)
1. Indigenous (47.0%)
2. European (42.0%)
3. African (11.0%)

Colombia, whose land was named after Christopher Columbus, is the product of the interacting and mixing of the European conquistadors and colonist with the different Indigenous peoples of Colombia. With the arrival of Europeans came the arrival of the enslaved Africans, whose cultural element was mostly introduced into the coastal areas of Colombia. To this day, Afro-Colombians form a majority in several coastal regions of the country.

Over time Colombia has become a primarily Mestizo country due to limited immigration from Europe in the 19th and 20th centuries, with minorities of mulattoes and pardos, both mixed race groups of significant partial African ancestry who live primarily in coastal regions among other Afro-Colombians; and pockets of Indigenous peoples living around the rural areas and the Amazonian Basin regions of the country.

Estimates of the Mestizo population in Colombia vary, as Colombia's national census does not include White or Mestizo as ethnic options. According to the 2018 census, approximately 87% of the Colombian population listed no ethnic affiliation, being mostly White or Mestizo, while an estimated 49–60% of Colombians are of mixed race. A 2010 study by Rojas et al. reported an average ethnic composition of 47% Indigenous, 42% European, and 11% African. A 2023 genetic study conducted by Criollo et al. estimated that the average admixture for Mestizo Colombians is 50.8% European, 40.7% Indigenous, and 8.5% African ancestry, however this varies significantly across regions of the country.

=== Ecuador ===
During the colonial era, the majority of Ecuadorians were Amerindians and the minorities were the Spanish conquistadors, who came with Francisco Pizarro and Sebastián de Belalcázar. With the passage of time these Spanish conquerors and succeeding Spanish colonists sired offspring, largely nonconsensually, with the local Amerindian population, since Spanish immigration did not initially include many European females to the colonies. In a couple of generations a predominantly Mestizo population emerged in Ecuador with a drastically declining Amerindian population due to European diseases and wars.

Afro-Ecuadorians, (including zambos and mulattoes), are a significant minority in the country, and can be found mostly in the Esmeraldas Province and in the Valle del Chota of the Imbabura Province. They form a majority in both of those regions. There are also small communities of Afro-Ecuadorians living along the coastal areas outside the Esmeraldas province. However, significant numbers of Afro-Ecuadorians can be found in the countries' largest cities of Guayaquil and Quito, where they have been migrating to from their ancestral regions in search of better opportunities.

As of the 2022 census, 85.17% of the population identified as Mestizo, a mix of Spanish and Indigenous American ancestry, up from 71.9% in 2000. The percentage of the population which identifies as European Ecuadorian was 2.2%, which fell from 6.1% in 2010 and 10.5% in 2000. Indigenous Ecuadorians account for 7.7% of the population and 4.8% of the population consists of Afro-Ecuadorians. Genetic research indicates that the ancestry of Ecuadorian Mestizos is on average 53.8% Amerindian ancestry, 38.3% European ancestry and 7.4% African ancestry.

=== Paraguay ===
During the reign of José Gaspar Rodríguez de Francia, the first consul of Paraguay from 1811 to 1840, he imposed a law that no Spaniard may intermarry with another Spaniard, and that they may only wed mestizos or Amerindians. This was introduced to eliminate any sense of racial superiority, and also to end the predominantly Spanish influence in Paraguay. De Francia himself was not a Mestizo (although his paternal grandfather was Afro-Brazilian), but feared that racial superiority would create class division which would threaten his absolute rule.

As a result of this, today 70% of Paraguay's population is mestizo, and the main language is the native Guaraní, spoken by 60% of the population as a first language, with Spanish spoken as a first language by 40% of the population, and fluently spoken by 75%, making Paraguay one of the most bilingual countries in the world. After the tremendous decline of male population as a result of the War of the Triple Alliance, European male worker émigrés mixed with the female Mestizo population to create a middle-class of largely Mestizo background.

=== Peru ===
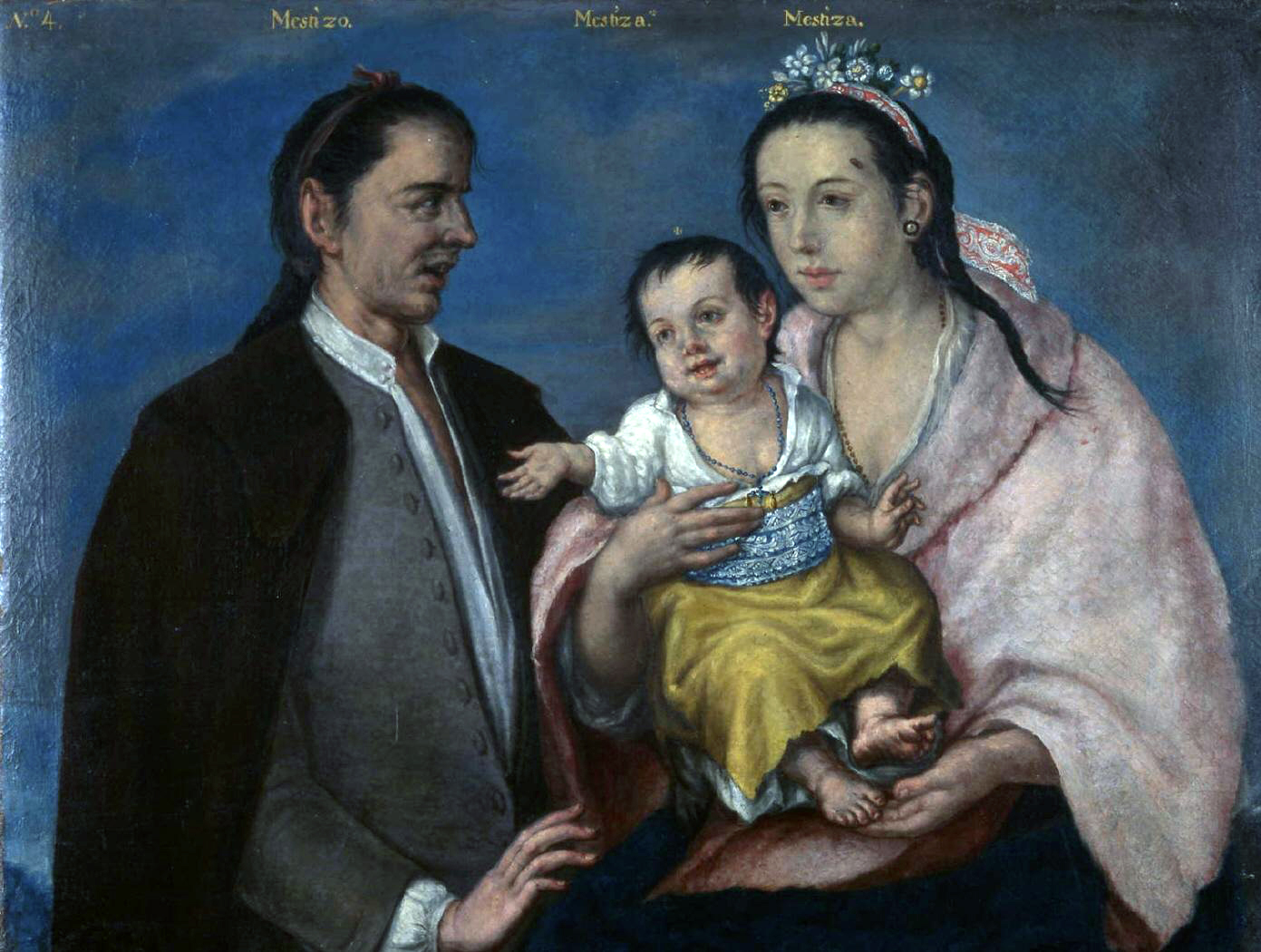
Mestizo-Mestiza, Peru, circa 1770

According to Alberto Flores Galindo, "By the 1940 census, the last that utilized racial categories, Mestizos were grouped with white, and the two constituted more than 53% of the population. Mestizos likely outnumbered Indians and were the largest population group."

For the first time since 1940, a question using separate ethnic self-identifications was included in the 2017 census. Results show that Mestizos were 13,965,254 or 60.2% of the population aged 12 years old and above.

=== Venezuela ===
Mestizos are the majority in Venezuela, accounting for 51.6% of the country's population. According to D'Ambrosio 57.1% of Mestizos have mostly European characteristics, 28.5% have mostly African characteristics and 14.2% have mostly Amerindian characteristics.

== Spanish East Indies ==
=== Guam and Northern Mariana Islands ===
In Guam and Northern Mariana Islands, which were administered from the Philippines under the Spanish East Indies, the term mestizo referred to people of mixed Chamorro (indio) or Filipino and Spanish ancestry. In the administrative racial hierarchy, they were ranked below the full-blooded Spaniards (peninsulares and criollos), but ranked higher than full-blooded Indigenous Filipinos and Chamorro. The term indio originally applied to both Filipinos and Indigenous Chamorro, but they were later separately designated in Spanish censuses in Guam. Like in the Philippines, this caste system was legally mandated and determined what taxes a person must pay. Both full-blooded Spaniards and mestizos were exempt from paying tribute as specified in the Laws of the Indies.

In modern Guam, the Chamorro term mestisu (feminine mestisa) refers to a person of mixed Chamorro and any foreign ancestry. It can be heritage-specific, such as mestisan CHamoru yan Tagalu ("female of mixed Chamorro and Filipino descent") or mestison CHamoru yan Amerikanu ("male of mixed Chamorro and White American descent").

=== Philippines ===
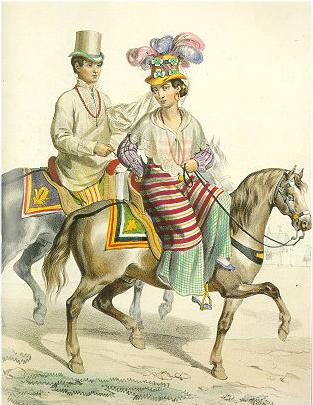
Mestizos de Español in the Philippines by Jean Mallat de Bassilan (c.1846), both are wearing native barong tagalog and baro't saya finery

In the Philippines, the term mestizo was used to refer to a person with mixed native (indio) and either Spanish or Chinese ancestry during the Spanish colonial period (1565–1898). It was a legal classification and played an important part in the colonial taxation system as well as social status.

The term most commonly applied to mestizos de español ("Spanish mestizos"), most of whom were descendants of intermarriage between Spanish settlers and the pre-colonial ruling families (caciques). They were part of the land-owning aristocratic class known as the Principalia. Like people of full Spanish ancestry (blanco, the peninsulares and insulares), mestizos de español were not required to pay the "tribute" (a personal tax) levied on natives specified in the Laws of the Indies.

The mestizo classification was also applied to people of mixed native and Chinese ancestry who converted to Catholicism, of which there was a much larger population. They were differentiated from the Spanish mestizos as mestizos de sangley ("Chinese mestizos"), most of whom were merchants and traders. They paid about twice the amount of taxes than natives, but less taxes than someone of full Chinese ancestry (the sangleyes).

Both mestizos de español and mestizos de sangley were often from wealthy families and thus part of the educated class in the late 19th century (the ilustrados). Along with children from wealthy native families, they played a prominent part in the Propaganda Movement (1880–1895), which called for reforms in the colonial government of the Philippines. Mestizos were a key demographic in the development of Filipino nationalism. During the 1700s, mixed Spanish Filipino Mestizos formed about 5% of the total tribute paying population whereas mixed Chinese Filipino Mestizos formed 20% of the population.

During the American occupation of the Philippines (1898–1946), the term expanded to include people of mixed native Filipino and American ancestry.

In the modern Philippines, the Tagalog term mestiso (feminine mestisa) refers to anyone who has the fair-skinned appearance of mixed native and European ancestry, often used as a compliment. It is commonly shortened to "tisoy" (feminine "tisay") in colloquial usage. Mestizo is also considered one of the archetypal beauty standards in the Philippines, the others being moreno (brown-skinned native appearance) and chinito (lighter-skinned East Asian appearance).

== Elsewhere in America ==
=== Aruba ===
Most of Aruba's population is ethnically mixed. The population is primarily descended from the Caquetío Indians, Dutch settlers, Spanish settlers, and Afro-Caribbeans. Although no full-blooded Aboriginals remain, the features of many islanders clearly indicate their genetic Arawak heritage.

=== United States ===
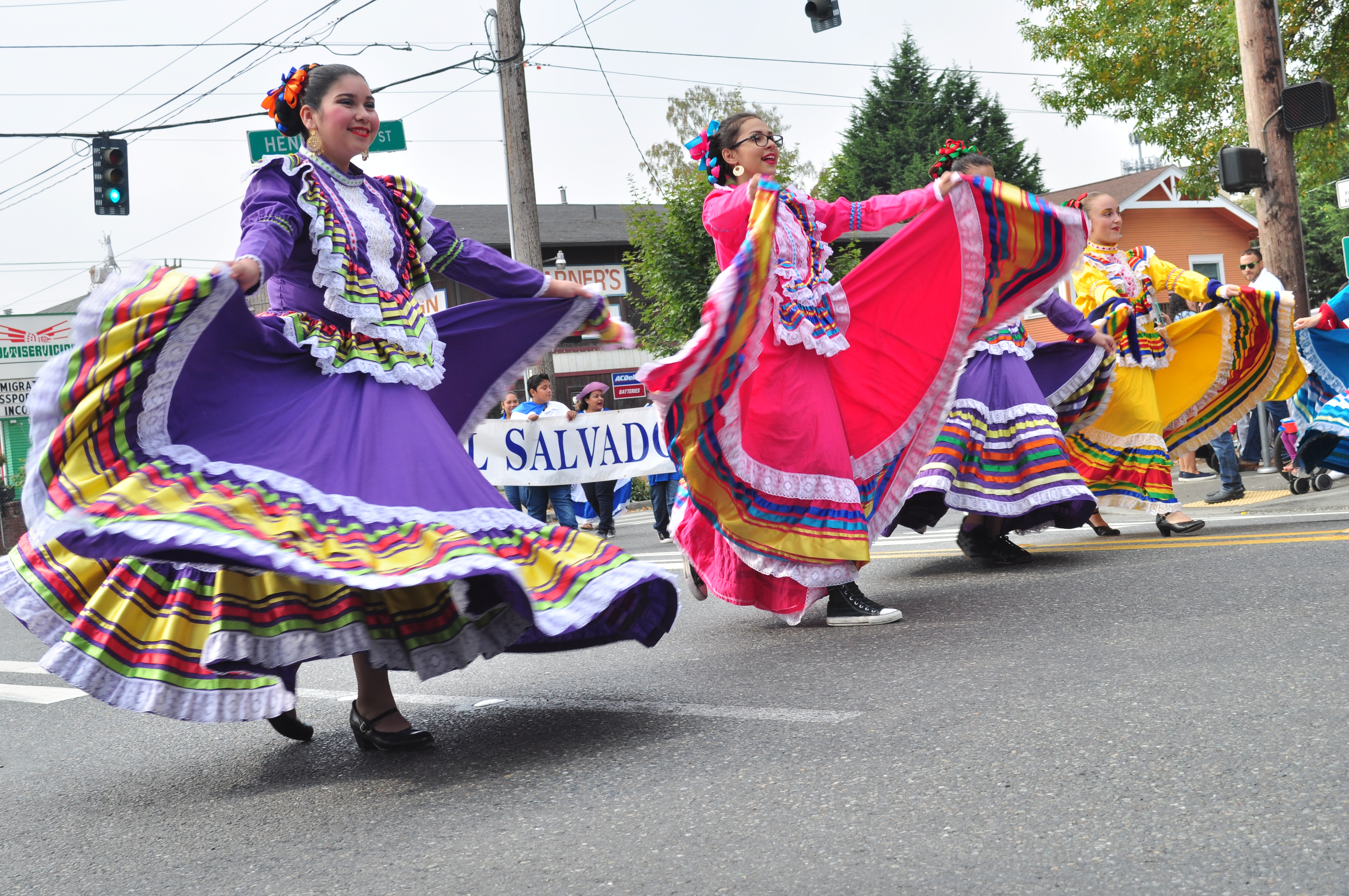
The dance group Joyas Mestizas ("Mestiza jewels") performs at the Fiestas Patrias Parade, South Park, Seattle, 2017

The category Mestizo, in the form of mestee or mustee, was used in the British colonial North America, e.g., in the Census of slaves, conducted in the Province of New York in 1755.

In the United States, a number of Latino Americans of Mexican or Central American or South American descent have family histories bound to categories such as mestizaje. The term mestizo is not used for official purposes, with Mexican Americans being classed in roughly equal proportions as "white" or "some other ethnicity".

A 2015 report by the Pew Research Center showed that "When asked if they identify as "mestizo", "mulatto" or some other mixed-race combination, one-third of U.S. Hispanics say they do". These were more likely to be U.S. born, non-Mexican, and have a higher education attainment than those who do not so identify.

== Mestizaje in Latin America ==
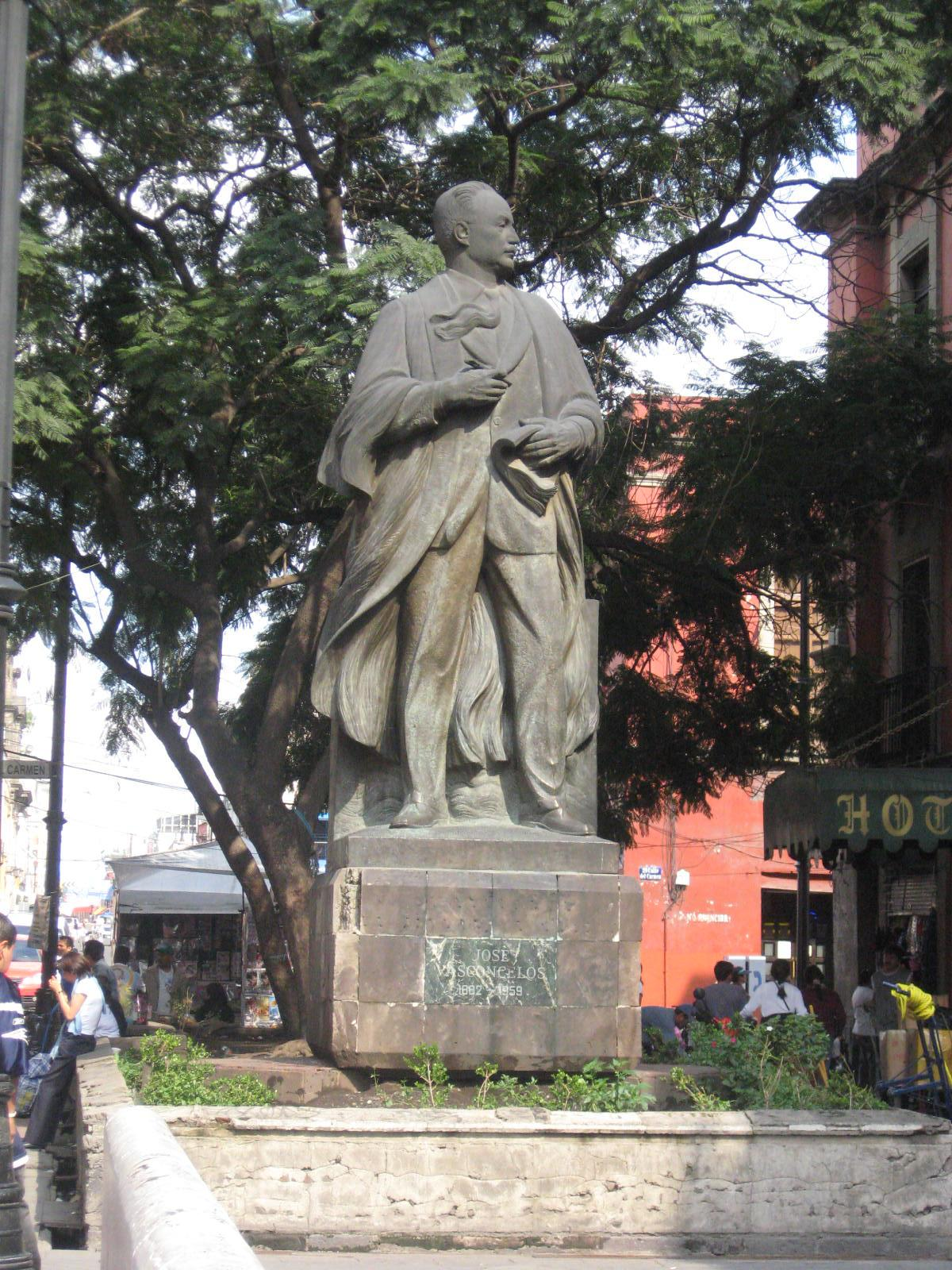
Statue of José Vasconcelos in Mexico City

Mestizaje ([mes.tiˈsa.xe]) is a term that came into usage in twentieth-century Latin America for racial mixing, not a colonial-era term. In the modern era, it is used to denote the positive unity of race mixtures in modern Latin America. This ideological stance is in contrast to the term miscegenation, which usually has negative connotations. The main ideological advocate of mestizaje was José Vasconcelos (1882–1959), the Mexican Minister of Education in the 1920s. The term was in circulation in Mexico in the late nineteenth century, along with similar terms, cruzamiento ("crossing") and mestización (process of "mestizo-izing"). In Spanish America, the colonial-era system of castas sought to differentiate between individuals and groups on the basis of a hierarchical classification by ancestry, skin color, and status (calidad), giving separate labels to the perceived categorical differences and privileging whiteness. In contrast, the idea of modern mestizaje is the positive unity of a nation's citizenry based on racial mixture. "Mestizaje placed greater emphasis [than the casta system] on commonality and hybridity to engineer order and unity... [it] operated within the context of the nation-state and sought to derive meaning from Latin America's own internal experiences rather than the dictates and necessities of empire ... ultimately [it] embraced racial mixture."

=== In post-revolution Mexico ===
At independence in Mexico, the casta classifications were abolished, but discrimination based on skin color and socioeconomic status continued. Liberal intellectuals grappled with the "Indian Problem", that is, the Amerindians' lack of cultural assimilation to Mexican national life as citizens of the nation, rather than members of their Indigenous communities. Urban elites spurned mixed-race urban plebeians and Amerindians along with their traditional popular culture. In the late nineteenth century during the rule of Porfirio Díaz, elites sought to be, act, and look like modern Europeans, that is, different from the majority of the Mexican population. Díaz was mixed-race himself, but powdered his dark skin to hide his Mixtec Indigenous ancestry. At the end of the nineteenth century, however, as social and economic tensions increased in Mexico, two major works by Mexican intellectuals sought to rehabilitate the assessment of the mestizo. Díaz's Minister of Education, Justo Sierra published The Political Evolution of the Mexican People (1902), which situated Mexican identity in the mixing of European whites and Amerindians. Mexicans are "the sons of two peoples, of two races. [This fact] dominates our whole history; to this we owe our soul." Intellectual Andrés Molina Enríquez also took a revisionist stance on Mestizos in his work Los grandes problemas nacionales (The Great National Problems) (1909).

The Mexican state after the Mexican Revolution (1910–20) embraced the ideology of mestizaje as a nation-building tool, aimed at integrating Amerindians culturally and politically in the construction of national identity. As such it has meant a systematic effort to eliminate Indigenous culture, in the name of integrating them into a supposedly inclusive mestizo identity. For Afro-Mexicans, the ideology has denied their historical contributions to Mexico and their current place in Mexican political life. Mexican politicians and reformers such as José Vasconcelos and Manuel Gamio were instrumental in building a Mexican national identity on the concept of "mestizaje" (the process of ethnic homogenization).

Cultural policies in early post-revolutionary Mexico were paternalistic towards the Indigenous people, with efforts designed to "help" Indigenous peoples achieve the same level of progress as the mestizo society, eventually assimilating Indigenous peoples completely to mainstream Mexican culture, working toward the goal of eventually solving the "Indian problem" by transforming Indigenous communities into mestizo communities.

In recent years, Mestizos' sole claim to Mexican national identity has begun to erode, at least rhetorically. A constitutional changes to Article 4 that now says that the "Mexican Nation has a pluricultural composition, originally based on its Indigenous peoples. The law will protect and promote the development of their languages, cultures, uses, customs, resources, and specific forms of social organization and will guarantee their members effective access to the jurisdiction of the State."

=== Elsewhere in Latin America ===
There has been considerable academic work on race and race mixture in various parts of Latin America in recent years. Including South America; Venezuela Brazil, Peru and Colombia.

== Europe ==
Through the colonial period, people of mixed Native American and Spanish ascendancy travelled to Europe. The Spanish Crown occasionally granted licences for the entry of "indian" slaves, including indios mestizos, into Iberia; some of them had children in the Peninsula, which may have been born free from servitude if the other parent was a Spaniard. After 1524, the Crown allowed for native women with mixed children, if their Spanish fathers recognised them as legitimate, to send them to Iberia to be educated in Spanish customs. Many of these were the children of nobles, including, for example, Martín Cortés, as well as the ancestors of the later counts of Miravalle and marquises and dukes of Moctezuma; the latter houses eventually established themselves fully in Europe, with the counts and dukes in particular becoming grandees.

In the modern day, many people identifying as mestizos live in Europe as a result of more recent migrations, including the descendants of refugees of the Spanish Civil War.

== See also ==
- African diaspora in the Americas
- Brown (racial classification)
- Bronze (racial classification)
- Casta
- Castizo
- Zambo
- European colonization of the Americas
- Indigenous peoples of the Americas
- Indo people
- Melting pot
- Mestizo art
- Métis
- Mischling
- Mixed-blood
- Mulatto
- Spanish colonization of the Americas
- Decree of November 8, 1928
