= Decree of November 8, 1928 =

French colonial law decree

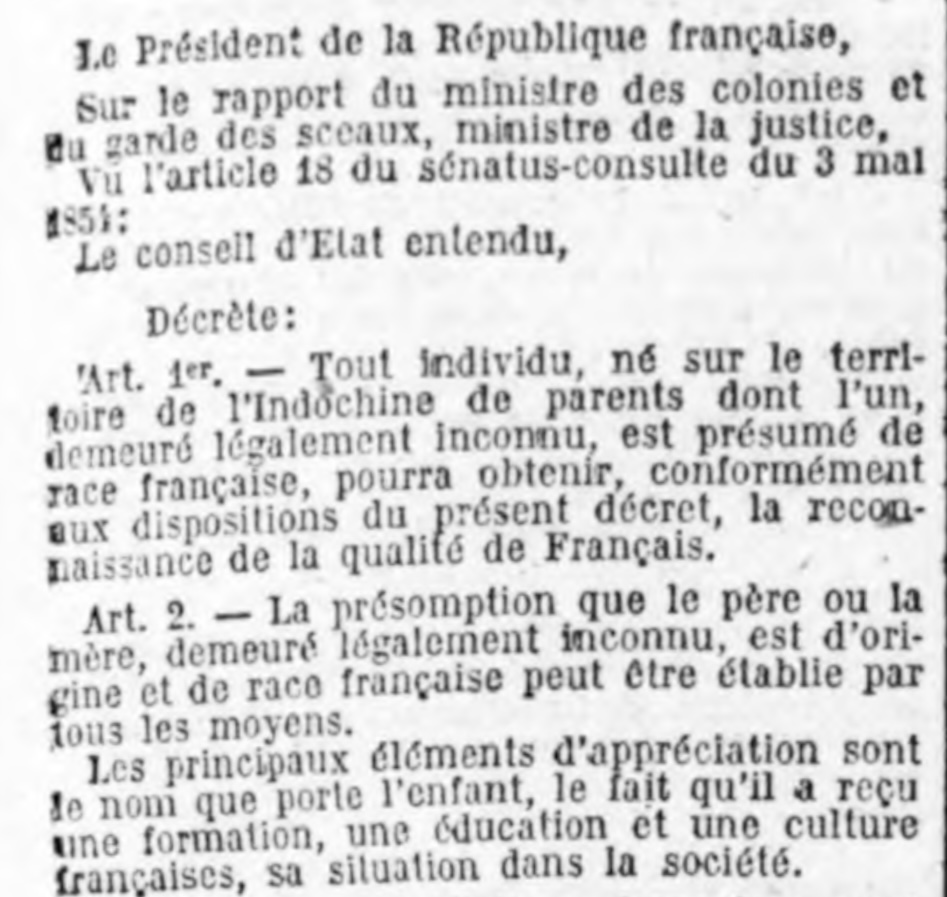

France
- Long title: Decree Establishing the Status of Métis Born to Legally Unknown Parents in Indochina
- Passed by: France
- Passed: 4 November 1928
- Signed: 8 November 1928
- Commenced: 8 November 1928
- Introduced by: Gaston Doumergue, Léon Perrier, Louis Barthou
- Status: Repealed

The Decree of November 8, 1928, is a French colonial law decree on the status of mestizos born of legally unknown parents in Indochina. It is notable for its reference to a “French race.”

Issued on November 4, 1928, the decree was published in the Official Journal on November 8, 1928. It is known by the latter name, contrary to the custom of designating decrees by their date of adoption.

== Application of the text ==
The decree of November 1928 refers to article 18 of the senate consult of May 3, 1854, which governs the constitution of the colonies of Martinique, Guadeloupe, and Réunion; this article states that “colonies other than Martinique, Guadeloupe, and Réunion will be governed by decrees of the Emperor.”

The draft decree of November 1928 was approved by the Conseil d'État on August 2, 1928. According to the report to the President of the Republic by Colonial Minister Léon Perrier:

It allows any individual born in Indochina of parents, one of whom, legally unknown, is presumed to be of French race, to claim French citizenship under certain conditions. To do so, legal action must be brought before the French courts by the person concerned if he or she is of age, by the public prosecutor's office, if he or she is a minor, or by a society for the protection of children approved by the authorities. The presumption that the legally unknown father or mother is of French origin may be established by any means, in particular by the child's name, the fact that he or she has received French training, education, and culture, and his or her position in society. A judgment granting French citizenship to a minor child will also appoint a guardian. This judgment must in all cases be transcribed onto French civil status registers, and will take the place of a birth certificate.

This forgotten decree, brought to light again in 2007 by historian Emmanuelle Saada, was adopted after decades of controversy over the legal status of mestizos in Indochinese colonial society. It enabled the acquisition of French citizenship by several thousand children born to a native mother and an unknown father “presumed to be of French race”, a colonist having failed to recognize the child.

Indeed, the need to address the status of mestizos in Indochinese society was raised as early as the 1890s by jurists, administrators, and philanthropists, as their status was contradictory: “French by race and skin color, but Indigenous by legal status and more”. The vast majority of mestizos in the colonies were the offspring of a French father and a native mother; the opposite case, of a French mother, arose mainly in metropolitan France during the First World War. Often abandoned by their biological French colonial father, “mixed-race children are perceived as downgraded, whose feelings of frustration and revolt against the colonial system are feared”.

As the decree did not limit how the French race could be recognized, administrators and jurists looked beyond variations in skin color: politeness, standing, sports, habits, holidays at the seaside and in the mountains: all these elements were taken into account in cases of naturalization of Vietnamese wishing to become French. Canadian historian Eric T. Jennings notes that the decree's colonial logic was “not to punish, but to rescue mixed-race people from an ‘unhealthy environment’ that would have led them to tip over to the Indigenous side of their identity”.

The 1928 decree was subsequently adopted and adapted in various parts of the empire where the status of mestizos was in question. The social category faded after the massive “repatriation” of mestizos linked to decolonization.

With this 1928 decree, French nationality law referred for the first time to the concept of “race” (article 2: “the presumption that the father or mother, legally unknown, is of French origin and race can be established by all means”), twelve years before the anti-Semitic legislation on the status of Jews during the Vichy regime. However, historian Nicolas Delalande notes that Emmanuelle Saada “demonstrates with precision that there is no link, nor any inspiration, between the use of race in colonial law and that made of it in the anti-Semitic law of Vichy.”

The 1928 decree did, however, mark a break with the past by substituting a biological conception of paternity for the principles defined in the Civil Code, which were based on the freedom of parents to choose their children, marking the beginning of the State's interference in filiation relationships.

== See also ==
- Race (French Constitution)
- Race (human categorization)
