= Old Town of Cáceres =

Old Town of Cáceres Ciudad Monumental de Cáceres
- Neighbourhood
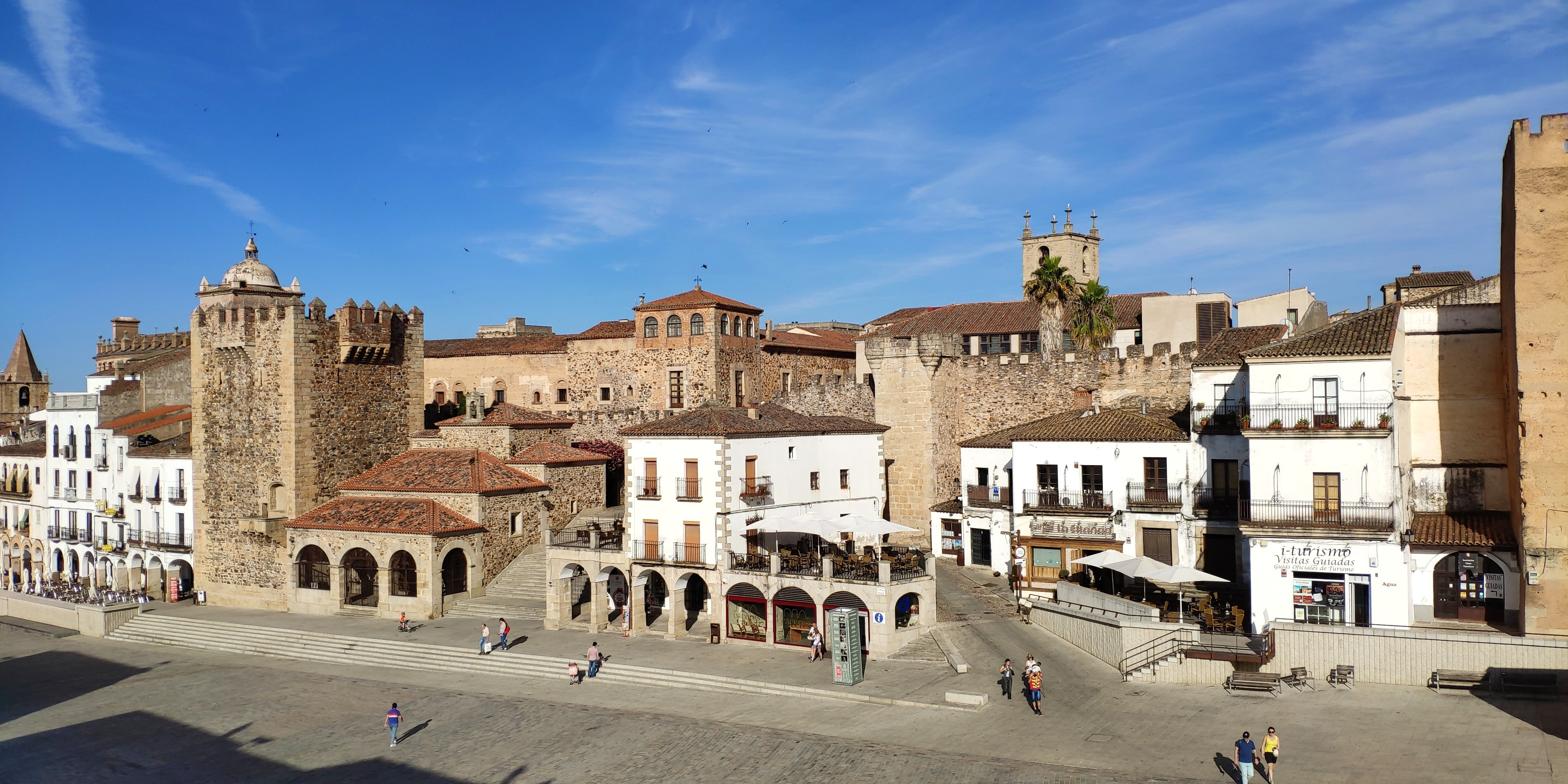

- Location within Extremadura Location within Spain
- Coordinates: 39°28′26″N 6°22′16″W
- Country: Spain
- Autonomous community: Extremadura
- Province: Cáceres
- Municipality: Cáceres

UNESCO World Heritage Site
- Criteria: Cultural: (iii)(iv)
- Reference: 384bis
- Inscription: 1986 (10th Session)
- Extensions: 2016
- Area: 9 ha (22 acres)
- Buffer zone: 60.63 ha (149.8 acres)

Spanish Cultural Heritage
- Type: Non-movable
- Criteria: Historic ensemble
- Designated: 21 January 1949
- Reference no.: RI-53-0000016

Old Town of Cáceres is a historic walled city in Cáceres, Spain.

Cáceres was declared a World Heritage City by UNESCO in 1986 because of the city's blend of Roman, Moorish, Northern Gothic and Italian Renaissance architecture. Thirty towers from the Islamic period still stand in Cáceres, of which the Torre del Bujaco is the most famous.

There have been settlements near Cáceres since prehistoric times. Evidence of this can be found in the caves of Maltravieso and El Conejar. The city was founded by the Romans in 25 BC.

The Old Town (Parte Antigua) still has its ancient walls; this part of town is also well known for its multitude of storks' nests.

== History ==
The origins of Cáceres were in prehistoric times, as evidenced by the paintings in the Cuevas de Maltravieso (Maltravieso Caves) which date back to the late Paleolithic period. Visitors can see remains from medieval times, the Roman occupation, Moorish occupation and the Golden age of Jewish culture in Spain. Cáceres has four main areas to be explored: the historical quarter, the Jewish quarter, the modern centre, and the outskirts.

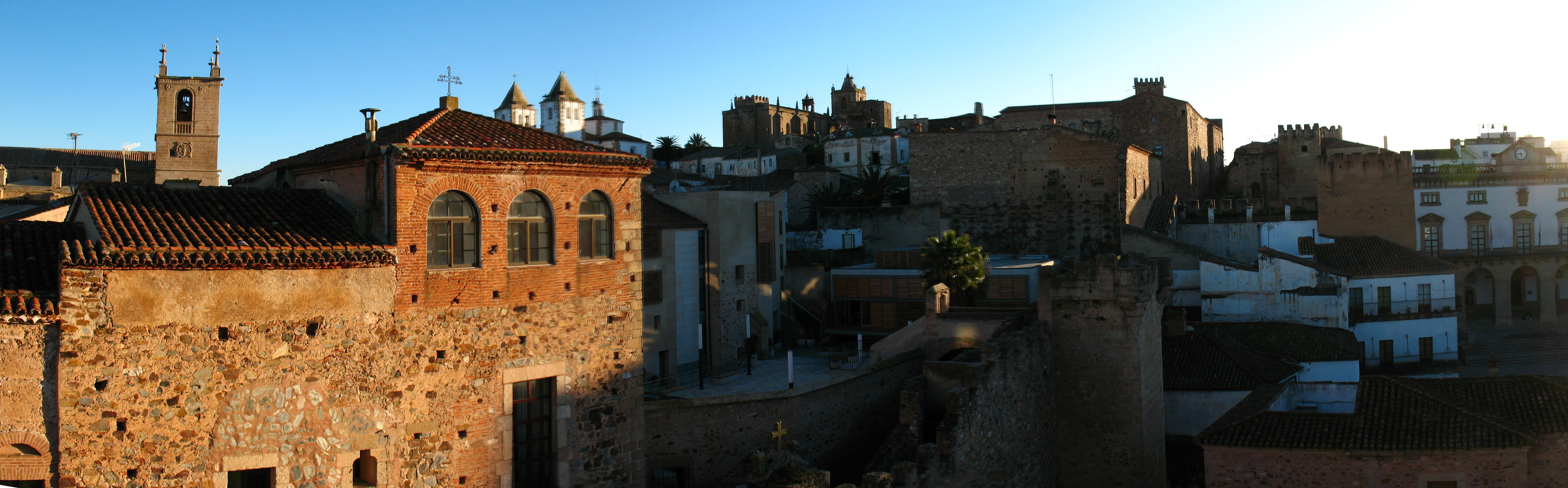
Panoramic of the Old Town as seen from the Bujaco Tower.

== City limits ==
The Old Town of Caceres is delimited in two great zones by the wall: intramuros (inside the wall) and extramuros (outside of the wall). The enclosure intramuros is what is usually known as "Monumental City" or "Old Part" and is the best known, while the area outside the walls is less well known. The whole Old Town, since the Middle Ages, is divided into 4 parishes, around which the structure of the city was configured. The four parishes are Santa Maria, San Mateo, Santiago and San Juan, with the first two intramuros and the last two outside the walls.

=== Santa María ===
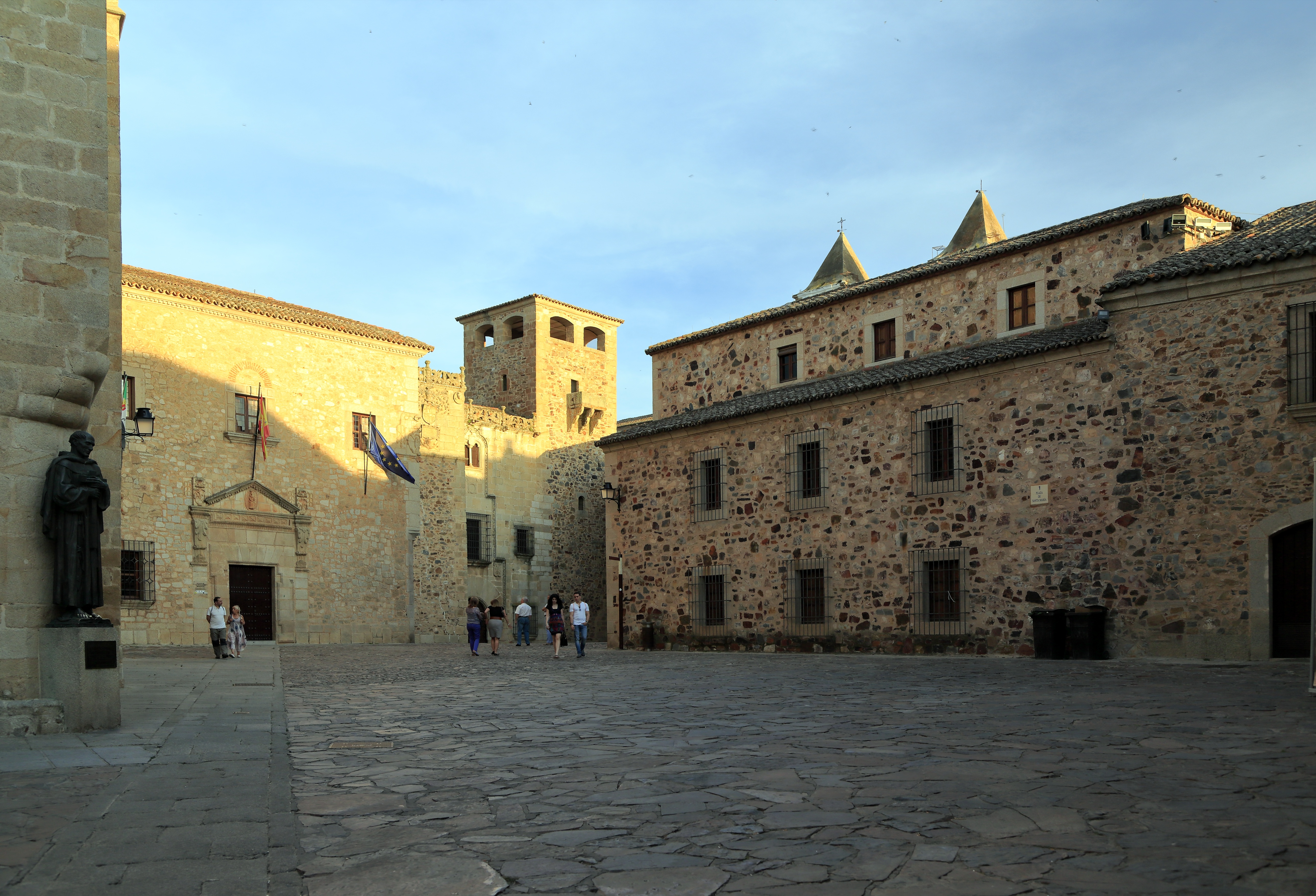
Plaza de Santa Maria

The Santa Maria quarter is formed by the union of two squares, the Plaza de Santa María and the Plaza de los Golfines, creating both a unique space. It is presided over by the Holy Church Cathedral of Santa María la Mayor, around which a set of palaces, mansions and noble houses are arranged delimiting the square. Adjacent to the apse of the Concatedral is the Palacio de Carvajal (headquarters of the Tourist Board of the Diputación de Cáceres, you can visit its interior facilities, the patio and the garden) and at the end of Calle Tiendas is possible to see the Torre de The Espaderos. Once again in the Plaza de Santa María you can see the Palacio de Hernando de Ovando and the Episcopal Palace, after which, in the Plaza del Conde de Canilleros, you will find the Toledo-Moctezuma Palace (Headquarters of the Provincial Historical Archives). If you continue in the Plaza de Santa María you can still see the Mayoralgo Palace, the House of Moraga (Provincial Center of Crafts), the House of Golfin-Toledo or Dukes of Valencia, the Palace of the Diputación, the Palace of Fomento and the magnificent Palace of Golfines de Abajo, which served as accommodation for the Catholic Monarchs during their stays in Caceres.

=== Saint George ===
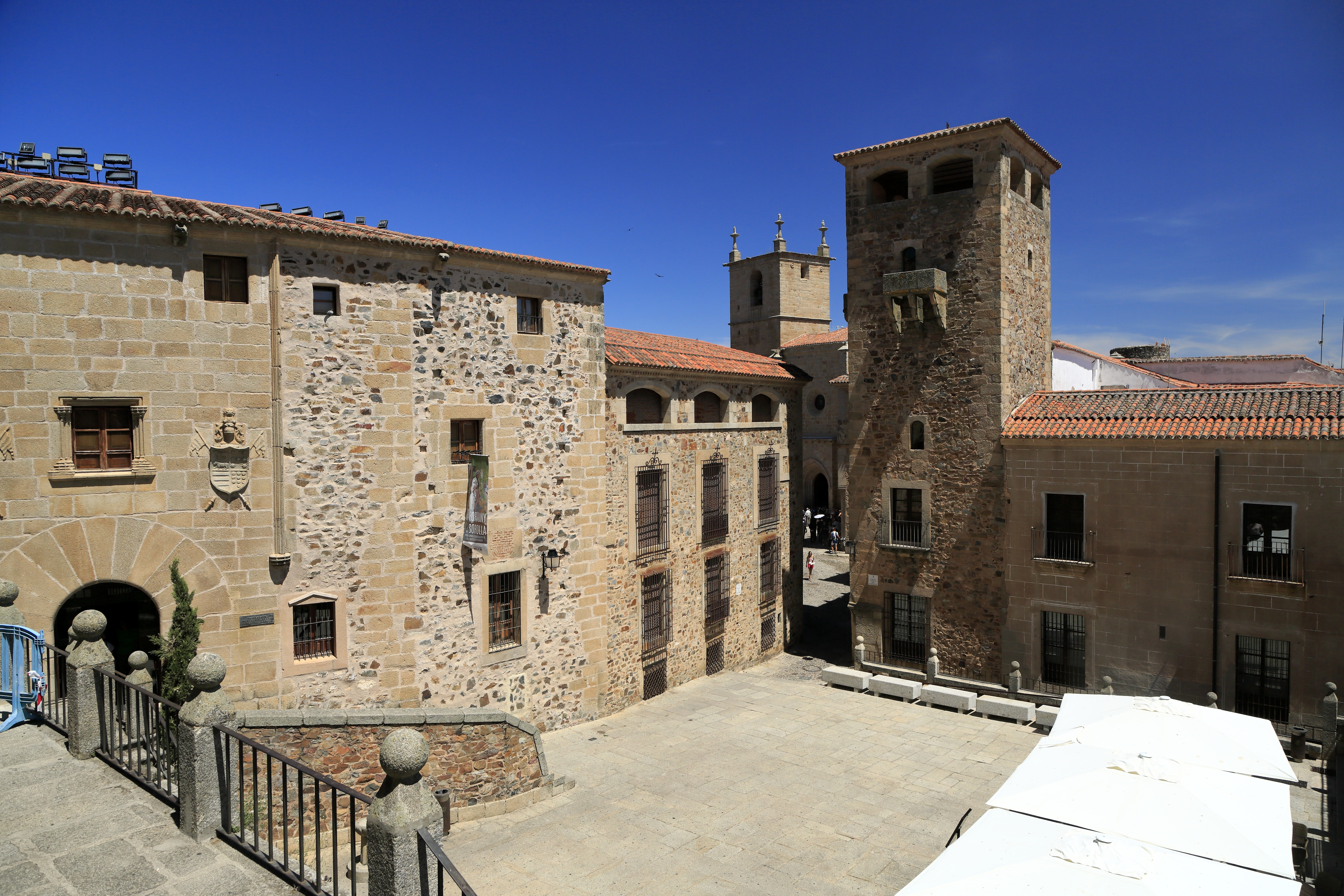
Plaza de San Jorge

The Plaza de San Jorge, in the center of the walled enclosure, is characterized by three buildings. Thus, it is dominated by the Church of San Francisco Javier or Church of the Precious Blood (in whose crypt is the Interpretation Center of the Holy Week of Cáceres and allows access to the largest cistern of Cáceres, eighteenth century). Next to it is located the College of the Company of Jesus. This baroque set that presides the square is accompanied to the right by the House of the Becerra (Headquarters of the Foundation Mercedes Calles and Carlos Ballestero). Finally, to the left, behind some stores selling souvenirs and handicrafts, is the Garden of Cristina de Ulloa, open space within the set formed by these three buildings of the Plaza de San Jorge, dedicated to the patron saint of the city.

=== San Mateo ===
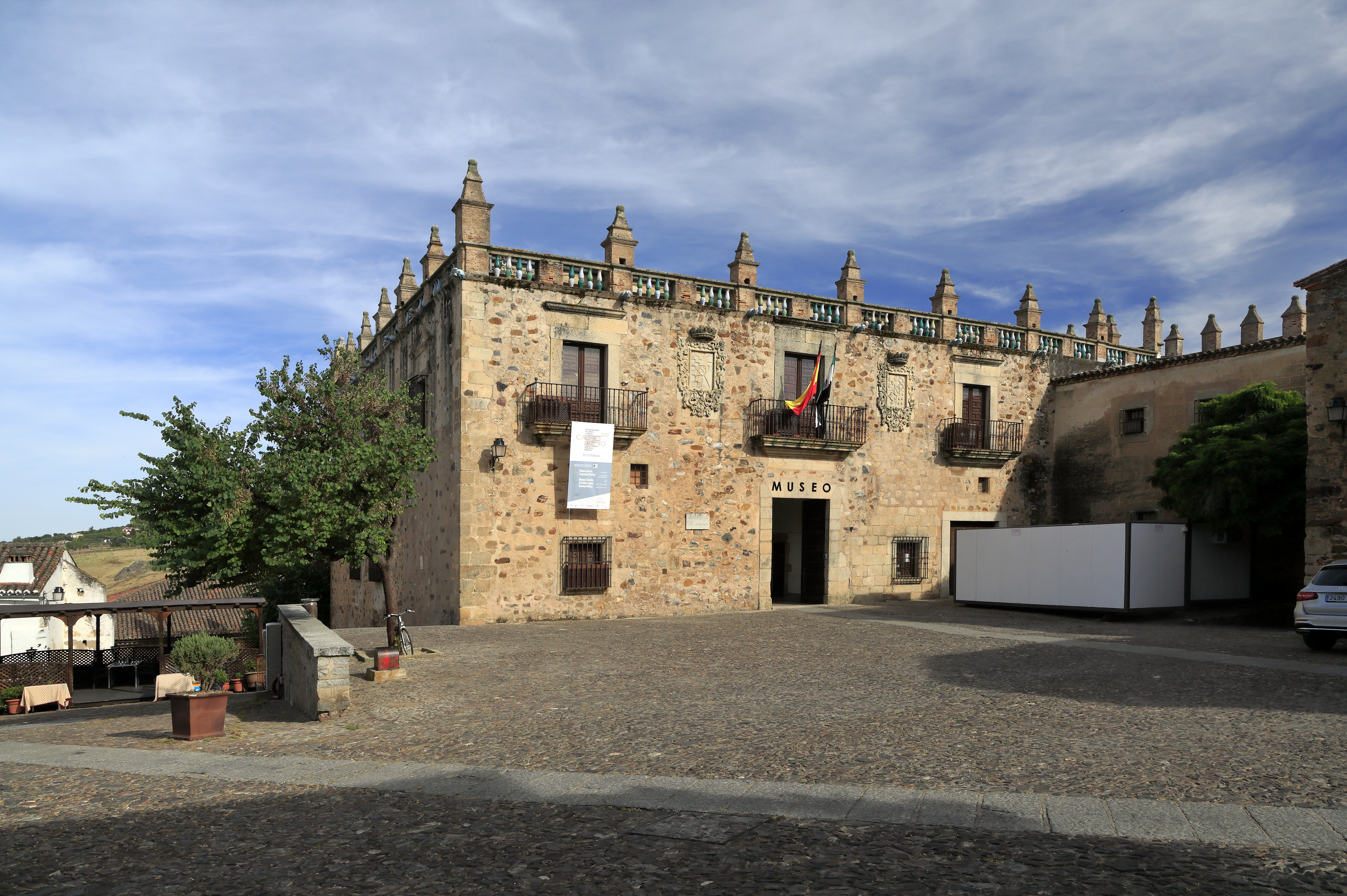
The Plaza de las Veletas is located in the San Mateo Quarter.

The San Mateo quarter, smaller than Santa Maria, is made up of three squares, the Plaza de San Mateo, the Plaza de San Pablo and the Plaza de las Veletas. This area is presided over by the Church of San Mateo (built on the old mosque). There is also another religious building, the Convent of San Pablo. Among the civil buildings, the most outstanding is the Palace of the Cáceres Ovando or Palace of the Storks (Headquarters of the Military Government). Completing the area of San Mateo, specifically in the Plaza de las Veletas, is the Palace of Veletas (Headquarters of the Archeology and Ethnography Section of the Museum of Cáceres, with a magnificent Almohad cistern, the oldest in the city) and The House of the Horses (Headquarters of the Section of Fine Arts of the Museum of Cáceres). Immediately behind the Church of San Mateo, there is a small square in which are three beautiful buildings that form a harmonious whole, the House of the Sun, the House of the Eagle and the Tower of Sande.

The Plaza de San Mateo is adjacent to the Palace of Golfines de Arriba. Descending from the plaza via Calle Ancha, the street is lined by several historically significant structures, including the House of Lorenzo Ulloa which serves as the headquarters for the Eulogio Blasco School of Fine Arts and the House of Diego de Ulloa el Rico. Other notable buildings along this route include the House of Walls Saavedra, the Casa de los Sánchez Paredes, and the Palace of the Commander of Alcuéscar (Marquis of Torreorgaz), which currently functions as the Parador de Turismo de Cáceres.

At this point, after crossing Calle Ancha, you will find the Puerta de Mérida. At this level it is possible to see the Hospital de los Caballeros to the right, while if you turn left you can appreciate the House of the Perers (Headquarters of the College Major Francisco de Sande).

=== The Adarve of the Star ===
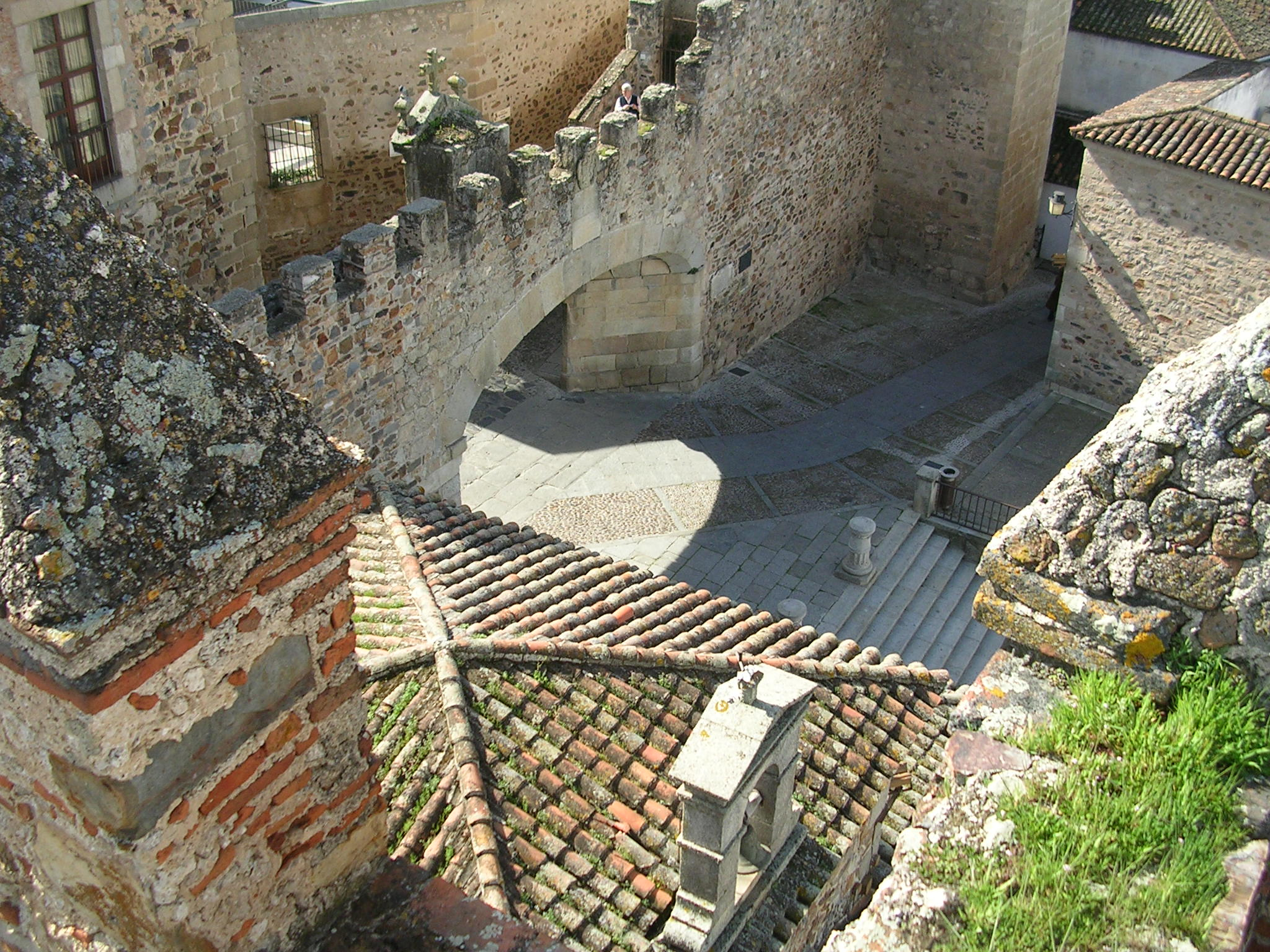
El Arco de la Estrella (Star Arch) one of the entrances through the wall from the Plaza Mayor to the Medieval City.

From Plaza de San Mateo, if you take Calle Condes, you will reach the area of the Adarves. The adarves are the streets adjacent to the wall, which is also known as the round road. In Cáceres five streets retain the name of Adarves (Father Rosalío, Santa Ana, Estrella, Bishop Álvarez de Castro and Christ), although when speaking of "the adarves", usually refers to the first three, which are followed, As if it were one way. The adarves (of Father Rosalío, Santa Ana and Estrella) constitute a street in slope, with narrows and pavement of small songs.

In this area you can appreciate the Arco de Santa Ana and Puerta del Postigo, the Tower of the Ved or the Postigo and the Tower of Santa Ana. In a small square in front of the Arch of Santa Ana is located the Palace of the Counts of Adanero. As the adarves descend, on the left is the entrance to Casa Miron (Headquarters of the Municipal Museum of Cáceres), and a little lower on the right is the Plaza de los Caldereros. This square, to the right of the adarves, is delimited by two buildings, facing each other, the Palacio de la Generala and the Palace of Ribera. Both buildings are the headquarters of the Rectorate of the University of Extremadura.

In front of the Plaza de los Caldereros there is a small door that leads to stairs that descend to the Forum of the Balbos, delimited by the Tower of the Furnace and the Tower of the Yerba, you can see from here the Town Hall and the Plaza Mayor. If the adarves are completely lowered and you return to the Plaza de Santa María, at the height of the House of Moraga, it is possible to start the passage through an area of streets, alleys and alleys of the Monumental City. Here, in the House of Moraga, begins an axis formed by the streets Cuesta de Aldana and Olmos, located in straight line and are narrow. Here you will find buildings as the Mono House, the Casa del Aldana, the Mudéjar House, the Casa de los Ovando Perero and the San Antonio Nursery. Finally, the small square where the Nursing of San Antonio is located ends at the union of the Calle Puerta de Mérida with the Adarve of Father Rosalío, being able to appreciate the Hospital of the Magdalena.

=== Old Jewish Quarter ===
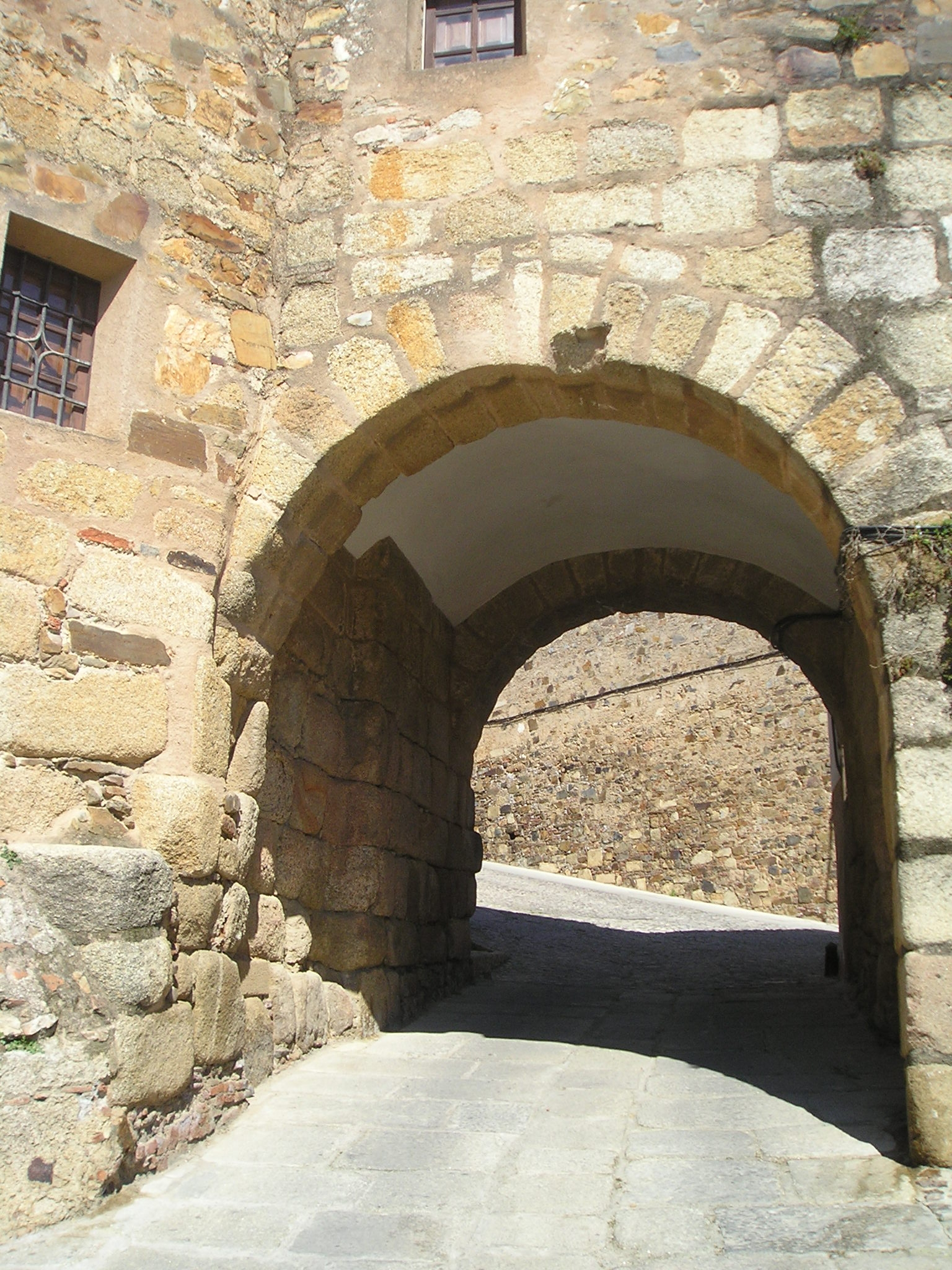
Arco de Cristo

The Arco de Cristo is the eastern gate of the old wall of Cáceres. It conserves Roman ashlars and in the antiquity was the door of the thistle of the colony Norba Caesarina.

Caceres came to have two Jewish neighborhoods: the Old Judería (in the enclosure intramuros) and the Jewish Quarter (in the area outside the walls). The Old Jewish Quarter or Old Jewish Quarter is also known as the neighborhood of San Antonio de la Quebrada. It preserves the layout and organization of the typical streets of the Islamic and Jewish period. These are narrow streets and on slopes, with small squares connected to each other, and with streets "in bottom of sack", that is to say, streets without exit. The houses are small, one to two floors, mostly white and decorated some of them with flowers such as geraniums among others, which gives a great tipismo to this neighborhood. It is conformed by the streets of San Antonio, Callejón del Moral, Rincon de la Monja and Cuesta del Marqués among others. The main building and center of the old Jewish quarter is the Ermita de San Antonio (built on the old synagogue). An interesting house is the House of the Rich Jew (popularly known for presenting a stone facade instead of being covered with lime, as was typical of humble Jewish houses). In the same Jewish quarter, through one of its houses, it is possible to access the Baluarte de los Pozos. It is a section of wall advanced to the rest formed by two towers, the Tower of the Wells or the Gypsy and the Tower Coraja or the Aljibes. It was a key point to guarantee access to the Ribera water. Also in the Jewry itself, near the Pizarro Gate, you will find access to the Olivar de la Juderia, which consists of a space like a garden or park located at the foot of the wall.

If you continue on Rincón de la Monja street, at the junction of the street with Cuesta del Marqués, there are two buildings to highlight. One of them is the House of Durán de la Rocha and the other is the Arab Museum House. When descending by Cuesta del Marqués, you arrive at the lowest point of the Monumental City and the most located to the east. Here you can find the Arco del Cristo, Puerta del Río or the council (the only door of Roman origin that has persisted in the city). From this point it is possible to visualize the Round Tower and, after crossing the arch, the River Tower. Surroundings

When the intramural enclosure could not accommodate more buildings, it was decided to build outside the walls around three fundamental spaces: the Plaza Mayor and the two parishes (Santiago and San Juan).

=== Main square ===
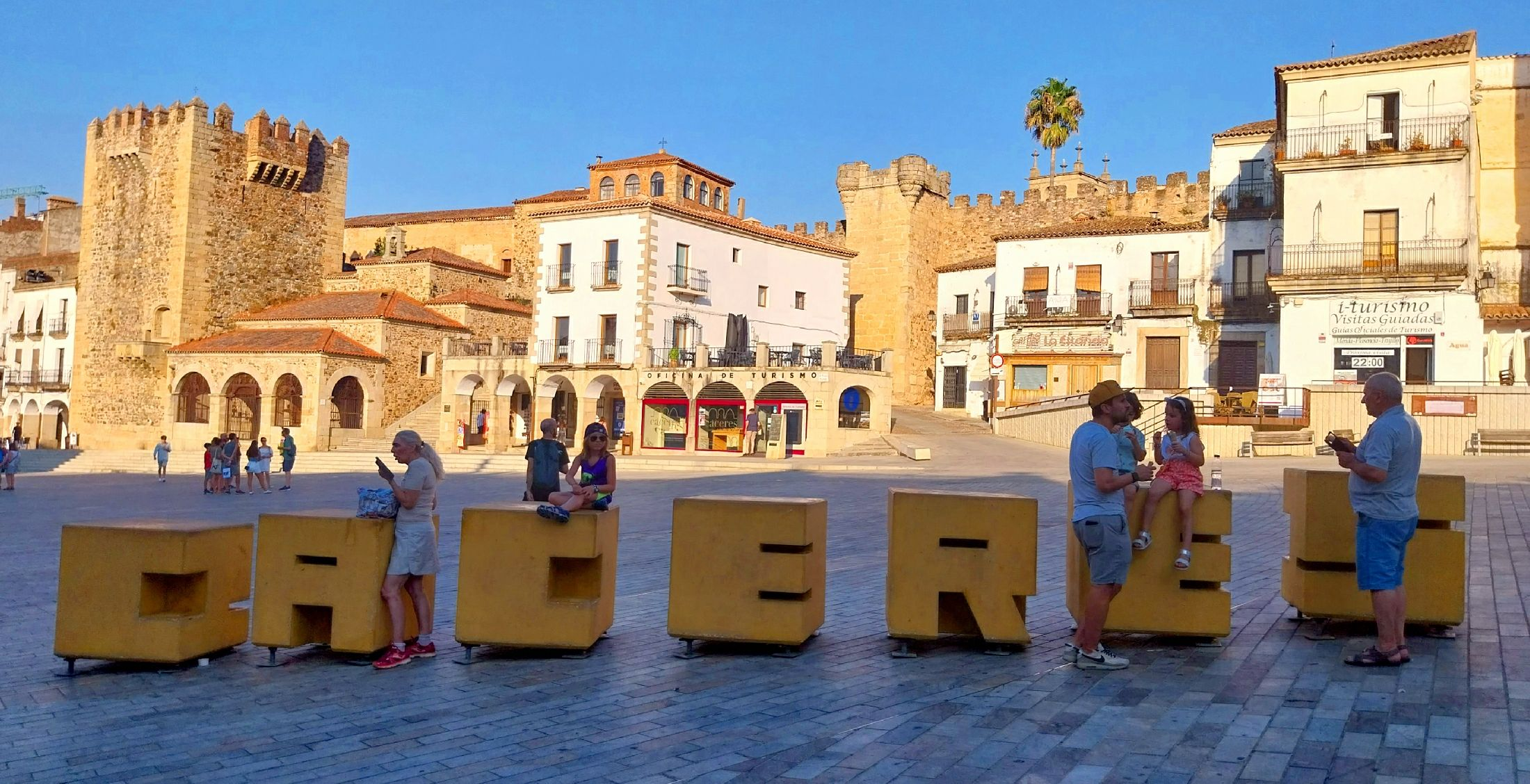
Caceres Plaza Mayor

The Plaza Mayor is constituted as the center of the Historic Quarter and gateway to the Monumental City. It emerged as a large space for markets, outside the walls. It is dominated in its east side by a frontal formed by the Tower of Bujaco, the Hermitage of the Peace and the Arc of the Star, being able to see also the Tower of the Pulpits and the Tower of the Yerba. To the south is the Town Hall, built at the end of the 19th century. The rest of the Plaza Mayor is formed by arcades that have their origin in the sixteenth century, although the buildings built on them are of very different epochs.

The portals housed different guilds, such as the Pan Portal, the Portal of the Plateros, the Portal of the Scribes, the Portal of the Apothecaries and the Portal of the Watchers, among others. The rest of guilds of the city settled in streets near the Plaza Mayor, such as the well-known and commercial Calle Pintores and others such as Paneras, Hornos, Hornillos, Zapatería, Caleros, Tenerías, Rivera de Curtidores, Boilers, Shops. In the surroundings and in the vicinity of the Plaza Mayor are the two medieval parishes (Santiago and San Juan), around which new spaces were created that, together with the Plaza Mayor, created the urban structure of the enclosure outside the walls.

== Main sights ==
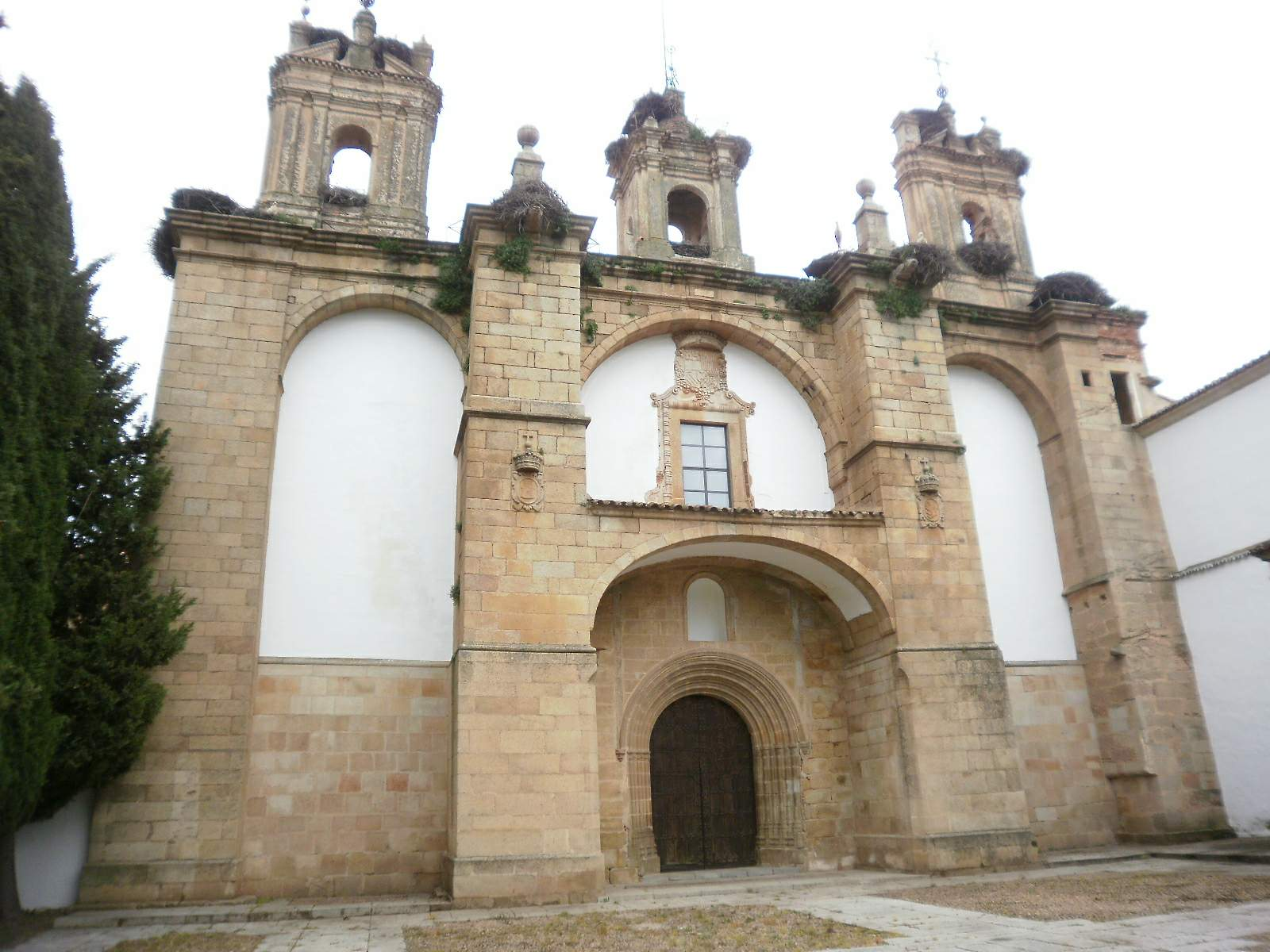
Storks are a common sight on towers in Cáceres. At least 14 storks nests can be seen by zooming in on the roof of this photo of a church located in the Monumental City.

=== Palaces and stately homes ===
- Episcopal Palace (Palacio Episcopal), facing the Plaza de Santa María, has a Renaissance-style main façade, dating to 1587, with a semicircular arch doorway. In 1583, King Philip II stayed in this palace upon returning from his coronation as king of Portugal.
- Lower Golfines Palace (Palacio de los Golfines de Abajo), built by the Golfín branch that settled in the city immediately after its reconquest. Two different styles can be seen in the building: the fortress-house from the 15th century and the humanist taste from the 16th century. Queen Isabel I of Castile (commonly known among English speakers as "Isabella I") and King Fernando II (Ferdinand II) of Aragon (the Catholic Monarchs) soujourned here. In gratitude for the family's numerous services to the crown, the Catholic Monarchs' shield was placed on the façade of their palace. The shield of the Carvajal family is displayed on the façade. Legends say that the members of the Carvajal family who gave rise to the Cáceres lineage were sentenced to death by King Ferdinand IV of Castile in 1312 for the murder of a nobleman. Before being executed, the brothers appealed their innocence, and the accused summoned the monarch to a judgment from God. Thirty days after the sentence, the king died unexpectedly and Carvajal family was considered innocent and acquitted of the case against them.
- Carvajal Palace (Palacio Carvajal) (15th century) is now the seat of the Patronage Office for Tourism and Handicraft of the province.
- Tower of the Carvajal Palace predates the palace and is believed to date to the period of the Reconquest of the city (1170–1229).
- Palacio de los Cáceres Ovando or the Palace of the Storks (Palacio de las Ciguenas), dating to the 15th Century, is known by that name because of the large number of storks that nested there. Measuring 425 meters high, it is the only untruncated tower in the historic site. The Ovando house was exempted from the royal order of Isabel I, issued against all the houses that remained loyal to Juana la Beltraneja in the dispute for the throne of Castile to lower their towers. After Isabel's coronation, Diego Fernández de Cáceres y Ovando was granted the right to build his tower in 1480.
- Veletas Palace (Palacio de las Veletas) is part of the Cáceres Museum complex. Dating to the 15th Century, it is a unique building within the monumental city of Cáceres, as it was built without defensive elements on the site of the old Almohad fortress. The museum houses important collections of archaeology, ethnography and fine arts. Most notable is the best-preserved cistern in the Iberian Peninsula, containing columns of Roman origin, constructed to store rainwater. Partly excavated in the natural rock, it is approximately 15 meters long by 10 meters wide. Sixteen horseshoe arches supported by 12 columns, some of Roman origin, form the five vaulted naves of the cistern.
- House of Caballos (Casa de los Caballos) is a 16th-century building that is located next to the Palacio de las Veletas. It once served as stables for the Palacio de las Veletas and now serves as the headquarters of the Fine Arts Section of the Museum of Cáceres.
- House of the Sun (Casa del Sol or Casa de los Solís) is a Gothic-style fortress house, built in the 15th century and renovated in the 16th century. The most significant element of the façade is the family coat of arms, a sun with a human face from which 16 rays radiate, 8 of them bitten by snake heads, all crowned by a helmet. It currently houses an important archive with documents about the Americas and the Philippines, guarded by the Fathers of the Precious Blood.
- Upper Golfines Palace (Palacio de los Golfines de Arriba) was ordered constructed as a fortress house during the 14th century by the couple formed by Isabel de la Cerda and García de Golfín (lord of the Casa Corchada). During the Spanish Civil War, the palace was the place chosen by General Francisco Franco to establish his headquarters on August 26, 1936, where he remained for 38 days and where he was acclaimed head of state of the rebel zone before the official proclamation in Burgos.
- Toledo-Moctezuma Palace (Palacio de Toledo-Moctezuma) dates to the 15th century with changes in the 16th Century, on whose surface are the heraldic shields of the Toledo and Carvajal families, in addition to that of the Moctezuma after the marriage of Mariana de Carvajal y Toledo with Juan de Toledo Moctezuma, who was a descendant of Juan Cano de Saavedra and Isabel de Moctezuma, daughter of the Aztec emperor Moctezuma II Xocoyotzin. Currently it houses the offices of the Cáceres Provincial Historical Archive.
- Palace of the Commander of Alcuéscar (Palacio del Comendador de Alcuéscar) or Palace-Fortress of Torreorgaz (Palacio-Fortaleza de los Torreorgaz), constructed beginning in the 14th century, followed the designs of Diego García de Ulloa, then Commander of Alcuéscar, from whom it received its name. After restoration at the end of the 1980s, since 1989 the Palace has housed, next to the Casa de los Ovando Perero building, the Cáceres Tourism Parador Hotel.
- Isla Palace (Palacio de la Isla), dating to the 15th Century, received its current name because during the 18th century its owners held the noble title of Marquises of Isla. Currently it is owned by the Cáceres City Council and is used as a cultural center and for holding various events and exhibitions.
- Francisco de Godoy Palace (Palacio de Francisco de Godoy) was ordered constructed in 1548 by Francisco de Godoy Aldana, a Spanish soldier who accompanied Francisco Pizarro in the conquest of Peru and later became Governor of the City of Los Reyes. He amassed a great fortune, being one of the conquerors who survived and were able to return to their land rich and respected. Upon his return to Cáceres in 1545 he married Leonor de Ulloa Ovando. Since 2023, the building has been undergoing renovations, as the Government of Extremadura has transferred it for the installation of a Hilton chain hotel scheduled to open its doors at the end of 2024.
- Generala Palace (Palacio de la Generala) was constructed in the second half of the 15th century. Currently it is owned by the University of Extremadura, where it has served as the Faculty of Law.
- House of Ovando (Casa de los Ovando) has architectural elements that can be seen today corresponding to construction in the year 1519 and subsequent reforms carried out during the 18th century. The house is protected as Spanish Historical Heritage.
- House of Becerra (Casa de los Becerra), built in the Gothic style, is the prototype of a model fortress house of Cáceres civil architecture of the late Middle Ages. It is currently the headquarters of the Mercedes Calles and Carlos Ballestero Foundation, fulfilling the wish of Mercedes Calles Martín-Pedrilla, for the social, cultural and economic development of the inhabitants of the city of Cáceres.
- House of Sánchez Paredes (Casa de los Sánchez Paredes), built in the 15th Century, is a Gothic-style fortified house. The coat of arms of the Sánchez Paredes family bears the Latin inscription under it that reads: "Non habemus hic civitatem manentem sedfuturam inquirimus." (We do not have a permanent city here, but we seek the one to come.)
- House of Lorenzo de Ulloa (Casa de Lorenzo de Ulloa), constructed during the 15th Century, currently houses the facilities of the Eulogio Blasco School of Fine Arts, dependent on the provincial council.
- House of Aldana (Casa de Aldana) or the Casa Mudejar is a fortress house in the Gothic-Mudejar style, combining elements of the Arabic and contemporary 15th Century architectural styles. The building contains the coat of arms with five fleurs-de-lis of the Aldana family.
- House of Ovando Perero (Casa de los Ovando Perero), built in Gothic Style, dates to the 15th Century. Together with the Palace of the Comendador of Alcuéscar, it currently forms the premises of the Caceres Tourism Parador Hotel.
- House of the Monkey (Casa del Mono), built in the Gothic style in the 15th Century, receives its name because it contains in its interior patio a sculpture of a monkey about which numerous legends circulate. It is property of the Provincial Council and currently houses the Alonso Zamora Vicente Library, which has a deposit of approximately 30,000 volumes inside.
- House of Pereros (Casa de los Pereros), built in the 15th Century, currently is intended for public use and is the property of the provincial council, which dedicates its facilities to housing the Francisco de Sande University Residence Hall.

=== Wall ===
- The Bujaco Tower (Torre de Bujaco) (12th century), the emblem of Cáceres and the most striking construction in the Plaza Mayor, protects the northwest flank of the monumental city of Cáceres. The current name of the tower is modern, perhaps coming from the caliph Abu Ya'qub (Abu Jacob), builder of the tower. It is a genuinely Arab building with a square floor plan built on reused Roman ashlars.
- The Star Arch (Arco de la Estrella) (18th century) has been the main entrance gate to the walled enclosure since the 15th century, being the best known in the medieval city of Cáceres. Before this arch the Catholic Monarchs swore the privileges of the city, granted centuries before by Alfonso IX: Isabel on June 30, 1477, and Fernando on February 27, 1478.
- Arco de Cristo (remnants of Roman wall), also known as the Council Gate (Puerta del Concejo) or River Gate (Puerta del Río), is a monumental gate which gives access to the walled neighborhood through the eastern wall. Built with large Roman ashlars dating back to the 1st century, it is the oldest gate in the city and one of the few preserved remains of the ancient Roman colony Norba Caesarina.
- Torre de Sande (14th–15th centuries) is a tower belonging to the Mansion of the Sande.

=== Cathedrals and churches ===
- Church and convent of San Pablo (15th century) Pablo (15th century) is a cloistered convent of Franciscan nuns, built on an old hermitage. It is popular n the city for its pastry products.
- Convent of la Compañía de Jesus, in Baroque style, today used for art exhibitions.
- Church of Santa María, (Iglesia Concatedral de Santa Maria) is a Gothic-style cathedral built in the 13th century.
- Iglesia de San Mateo, a Gothic-style 15th-century church, dedicated to Saint Matthew, Apostle and Evangelist, is built on the site of a former mosque. In the chapels are located the burials of numerous Cáceres nobles.
- Iglesia de San Francisco Javier (18th century), also known as the Church of the Precious Blood, in Baroque style, is a Jesuit church built in the 18th century. It was built, next to the attached convent, with the fortune of a Jesuit from the Figueroa family, who was last link in a line that was becoming extinct. Construction began in 1698 and concluded in 1755.
- Iglesia de San Juan Bautista is a large majestic Gothic-style church built between the 13th and 15th centuries.
- Church and Convent of Santo Domingo was built during the 16th century by the Dominican Order and currently belongs to the mendicant Order of the Franciscans.
- Hermitage de la Paz, completed in 1750, situated in the Plaza Mayor, stands on the remains of a Renaissance chapel dedicated to Saint Benedict. In 1720, the brotherhood of Our Lady of Peace asked the bishop for permission to rebuild the temple and be able to celebrate mass there.
- Church of Santiago de los Caballeros, according to some documents, has origins dating to the 12th century, although the oldest remains that are preserved date to the 14th century. Two centuries later, in the midst of the Renaissance (16th century), the master Rodrigo Gil de Hontañón took charge of its restoration, incorporating at this time constructive and aesthetic elements typical of the time.

== In popular culture ==
The walls contain a medieval town setting with no outward signs of modernity, which is why many television shows and films have been shot there. Game of Thrones filming locations included:

- Museo de Cáceres, comprising the Palace of Las Veletas and the Casa de los Caballos (Season 7, Episode 5), where Sam Tarly is seen wandering around an old library
- Arco de la Estrella (Star Arch) and Plaza Santa María (Season 7, Episode 3) locations for scenes for the King's Landing, where a parading of prisoners begins at the Plaza Santa Maria and ends at the Arco de la Estrella.

== Gallery ==
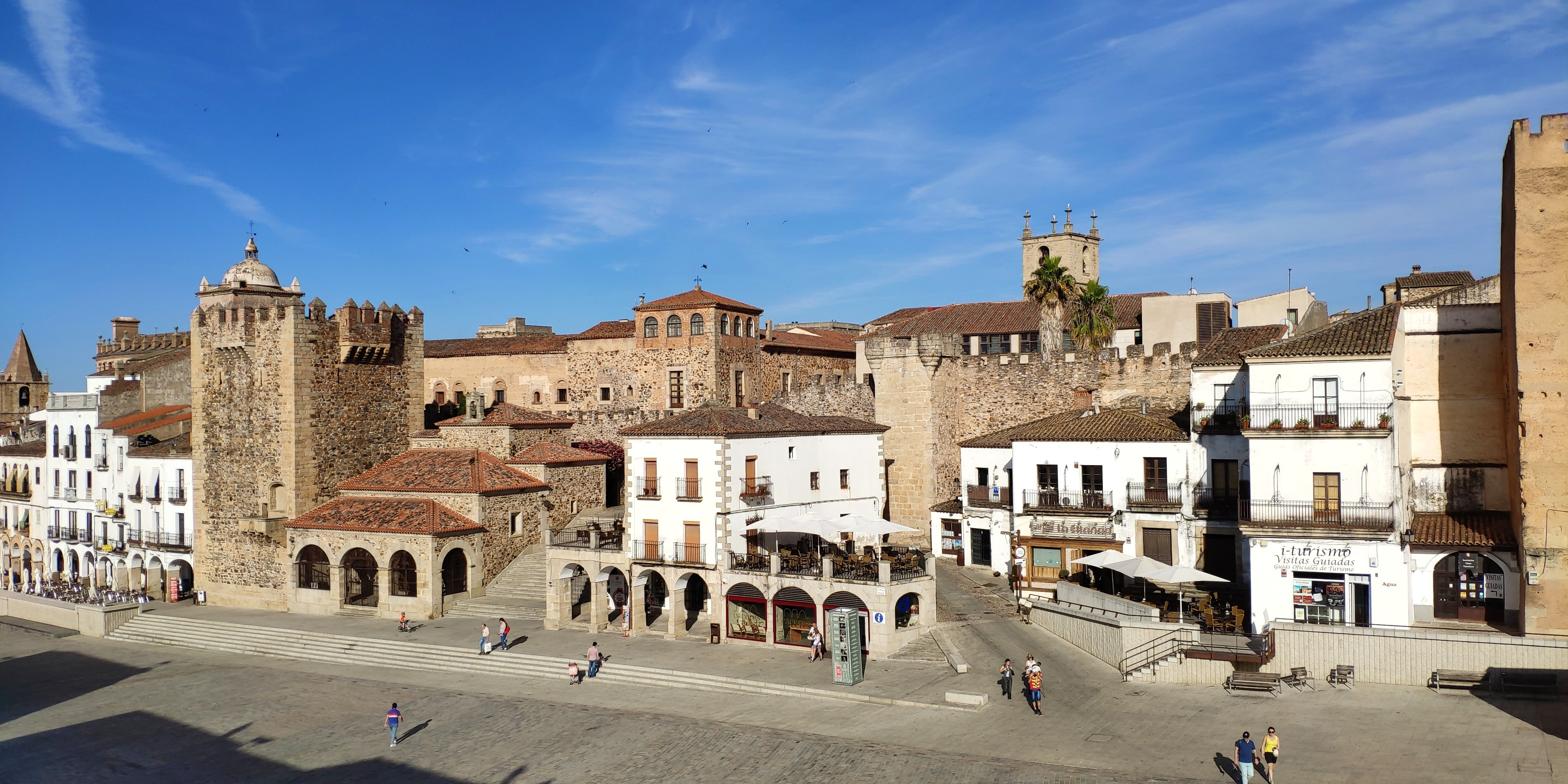
The Plaza Mayor, located in the Parte Antigua (Monumental City) of Caceres

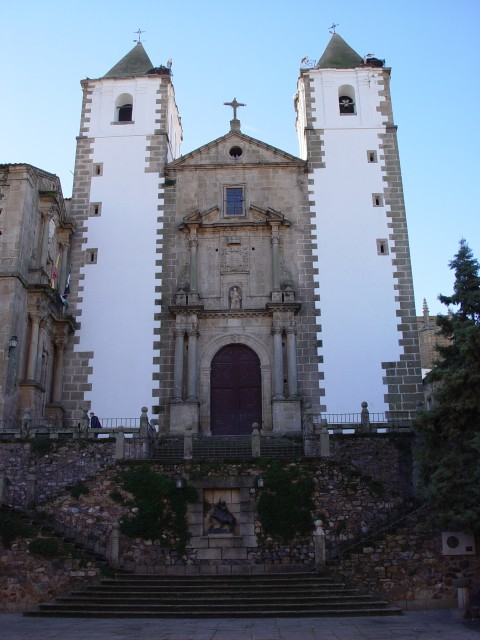
Church of Saint Francis Xaviar

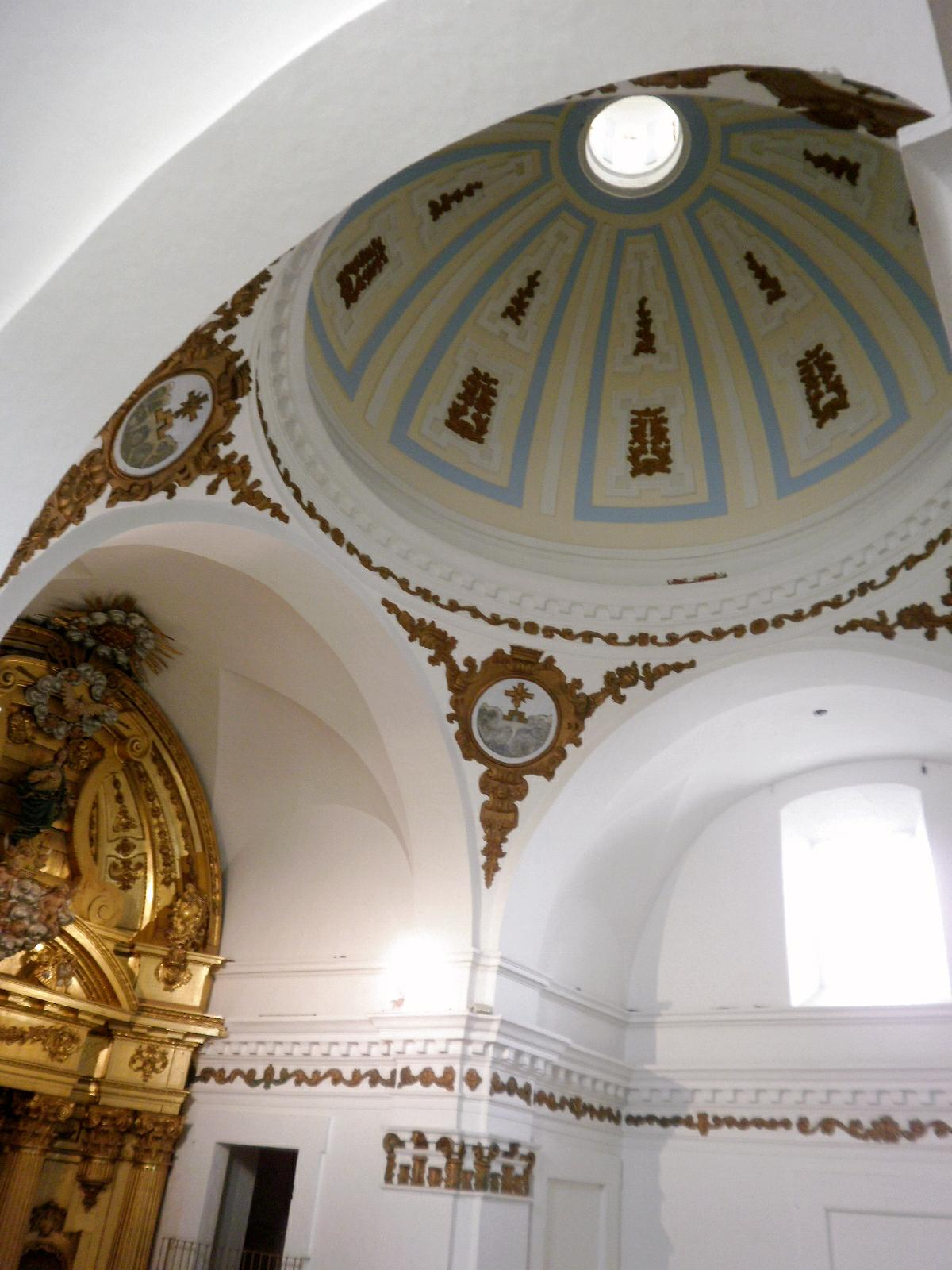
Interior of the dome of the San Francisco Javier Church

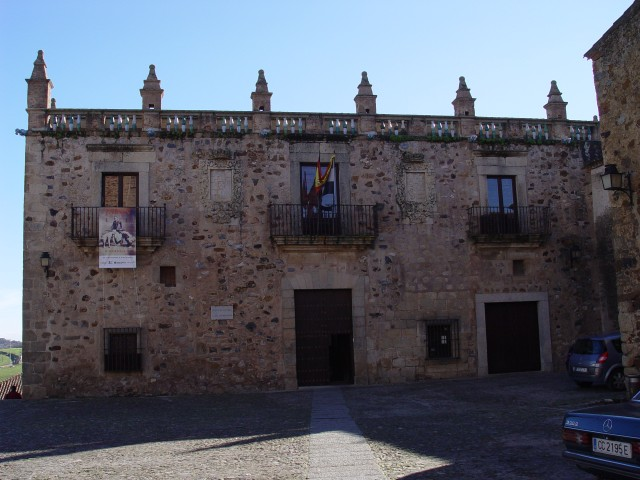
Veletas Palace

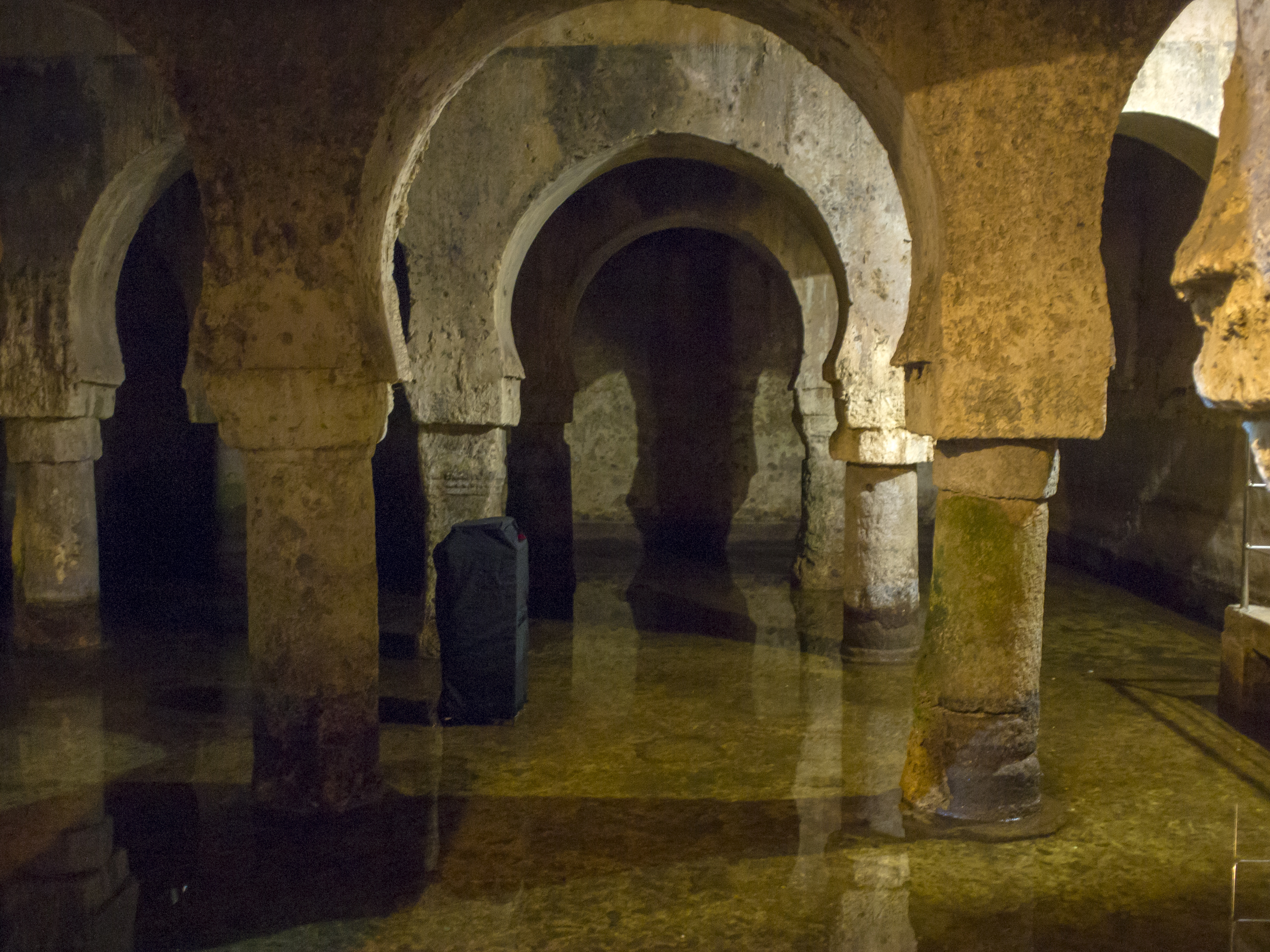
Aljibe (cistern) of the Veletas Palace, constructed to store potable rainwater, with arches dating to the Roman period

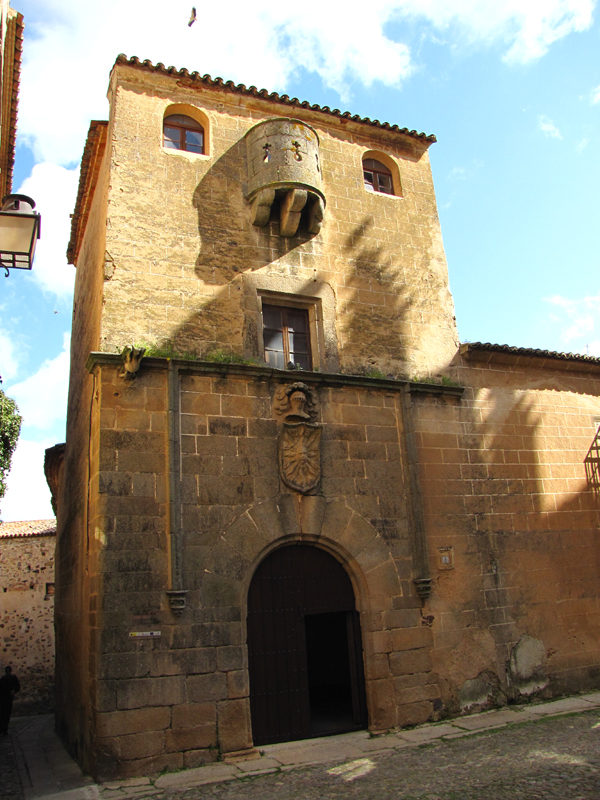
La Casa del Sol (House of the Sun)

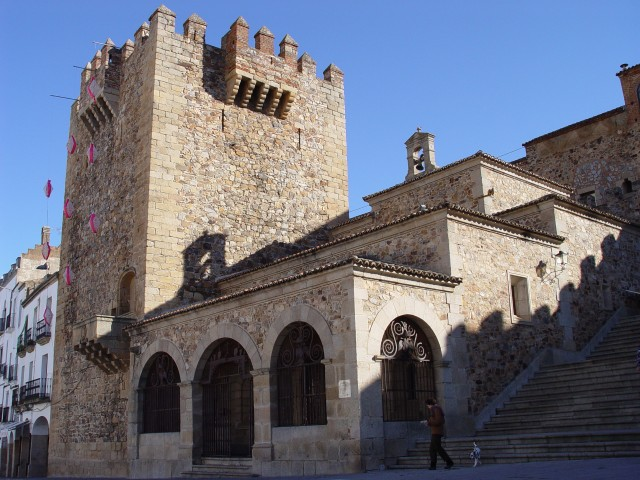
Tower of Bujaco and Hermitage of the Peace

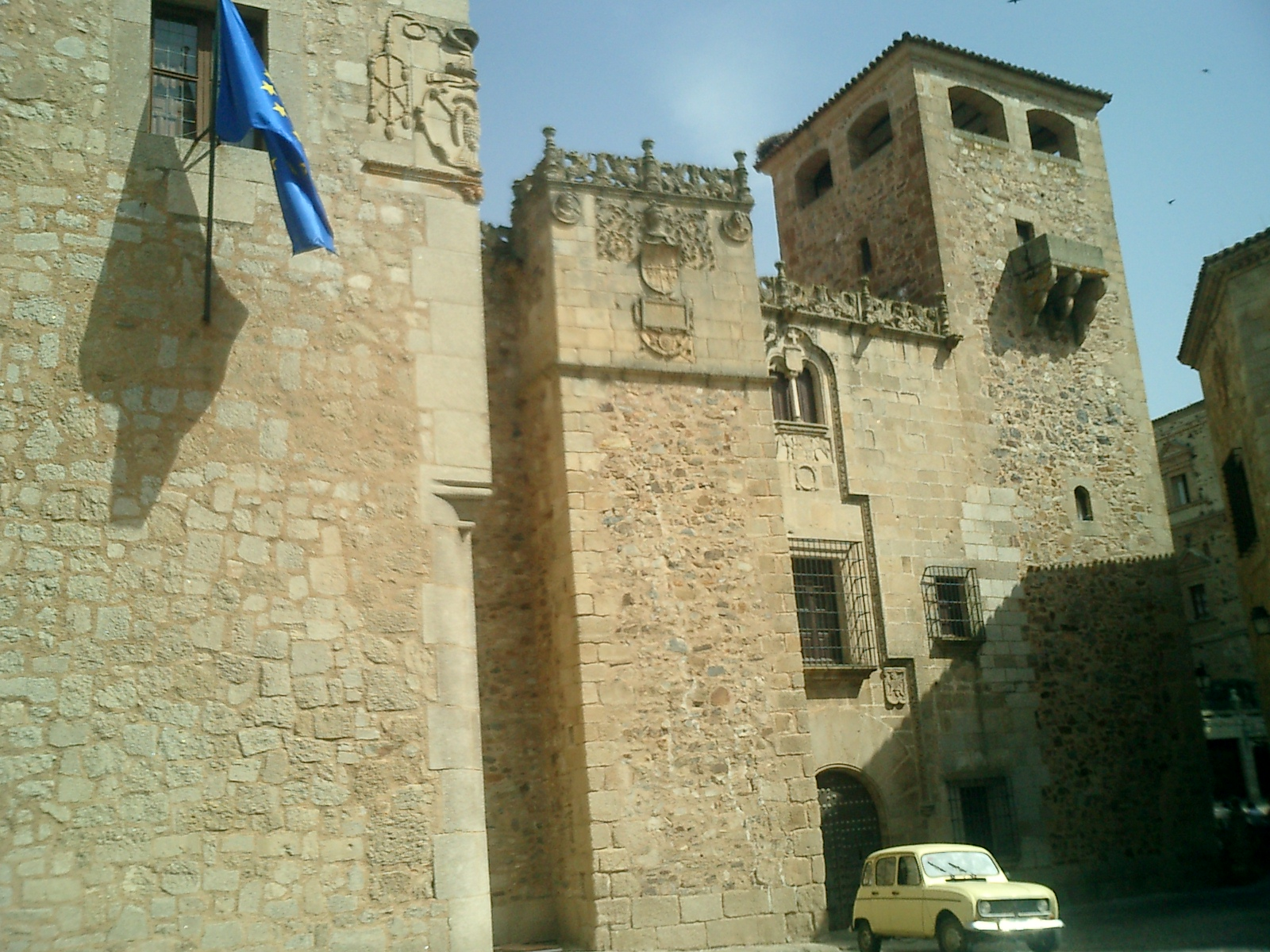
Palace of the Golfines de Abajo

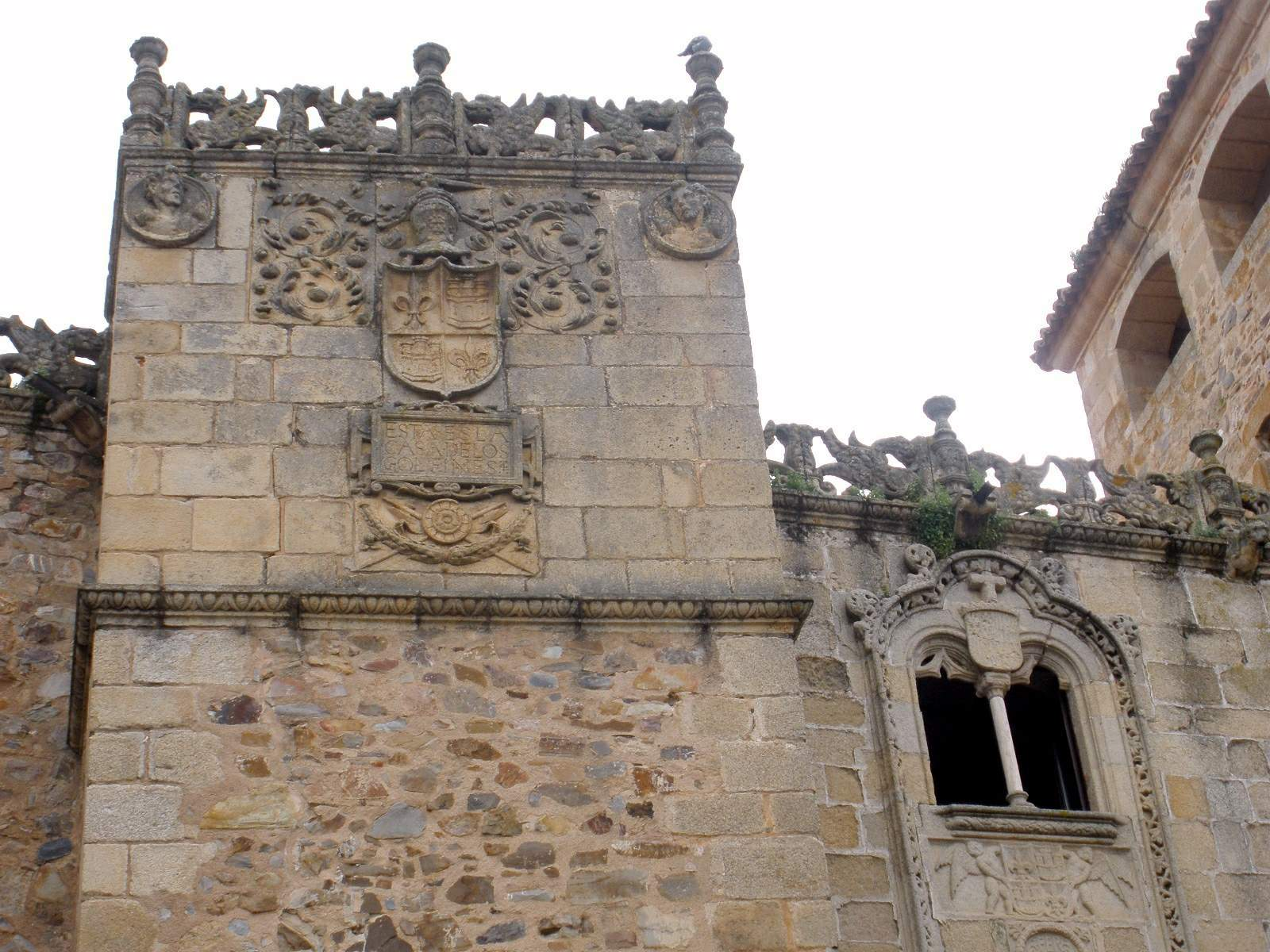
Detail of the Casa de los Golfines de Abajo

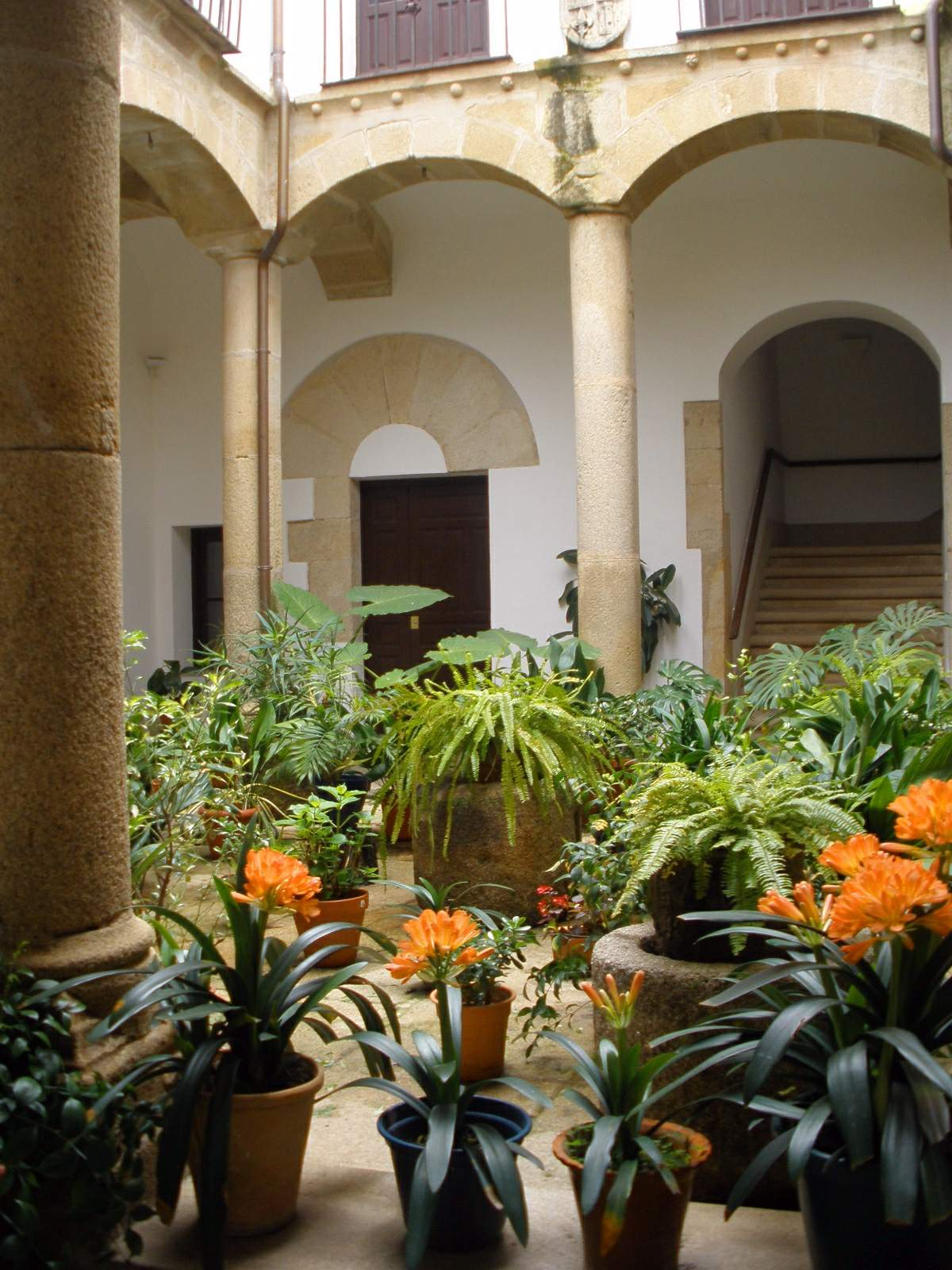
Courtyard of the Casa de los Golfines de Abajo

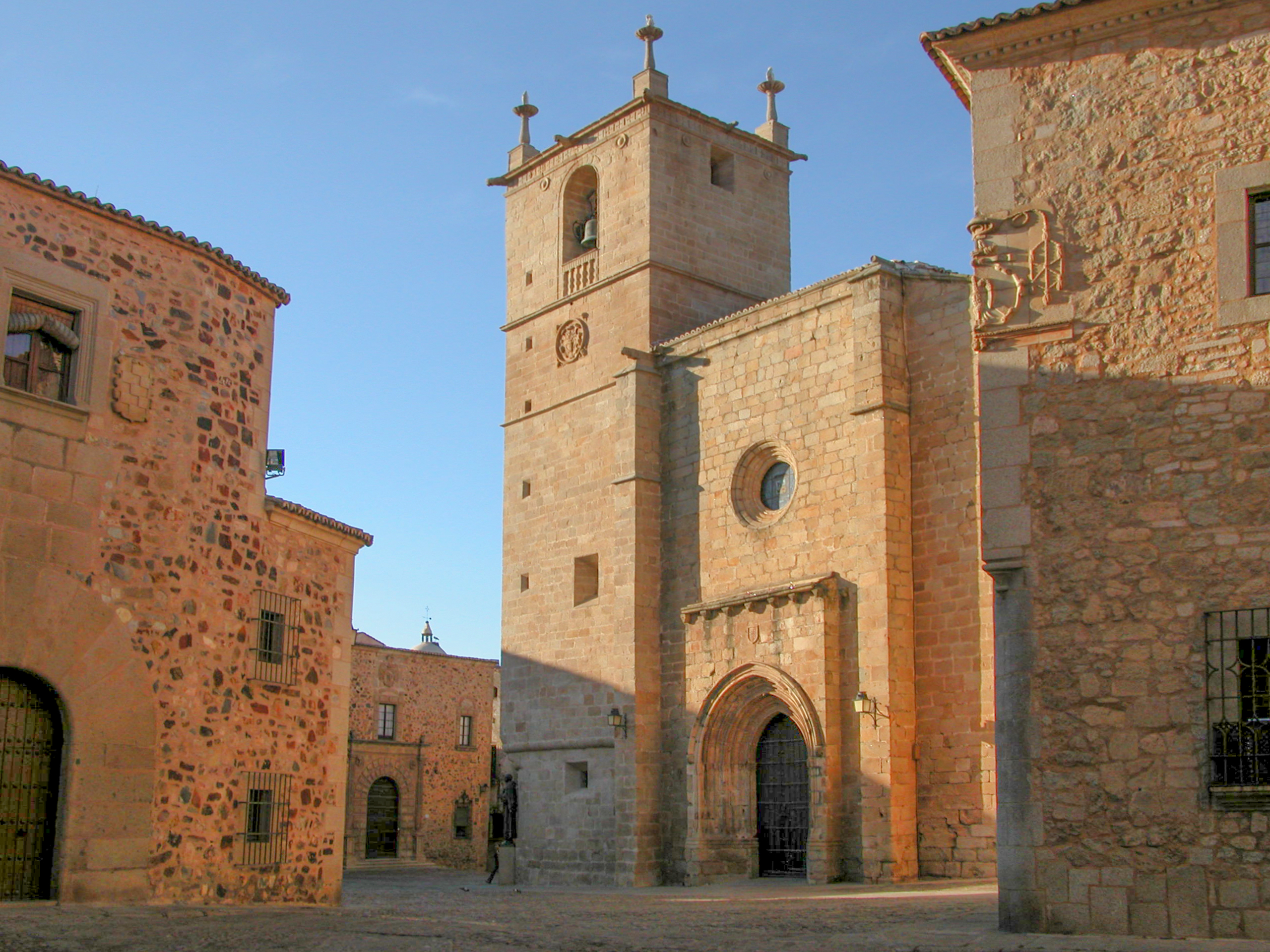
Cathedral of Cáceres

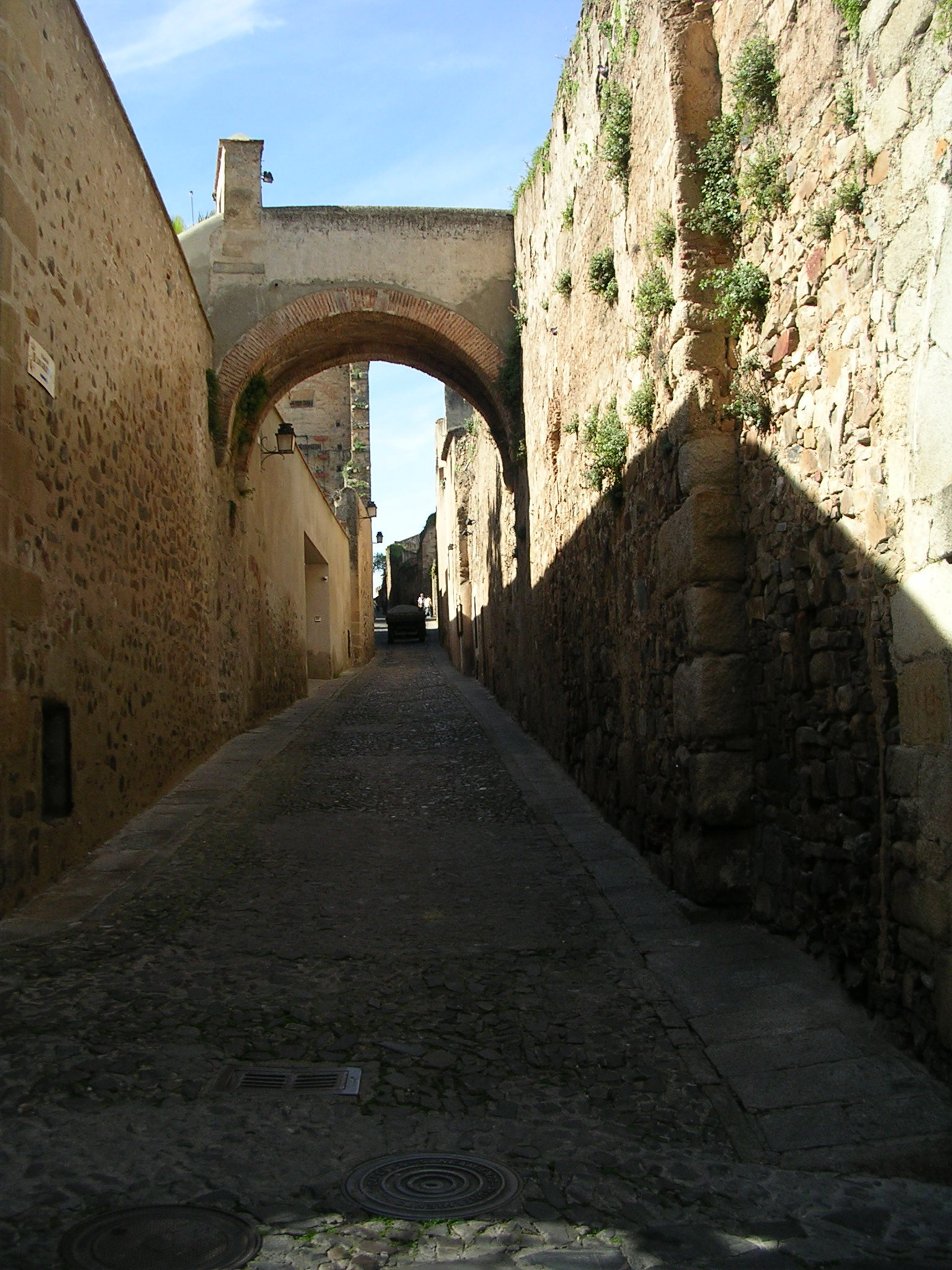
Adarve of the Star

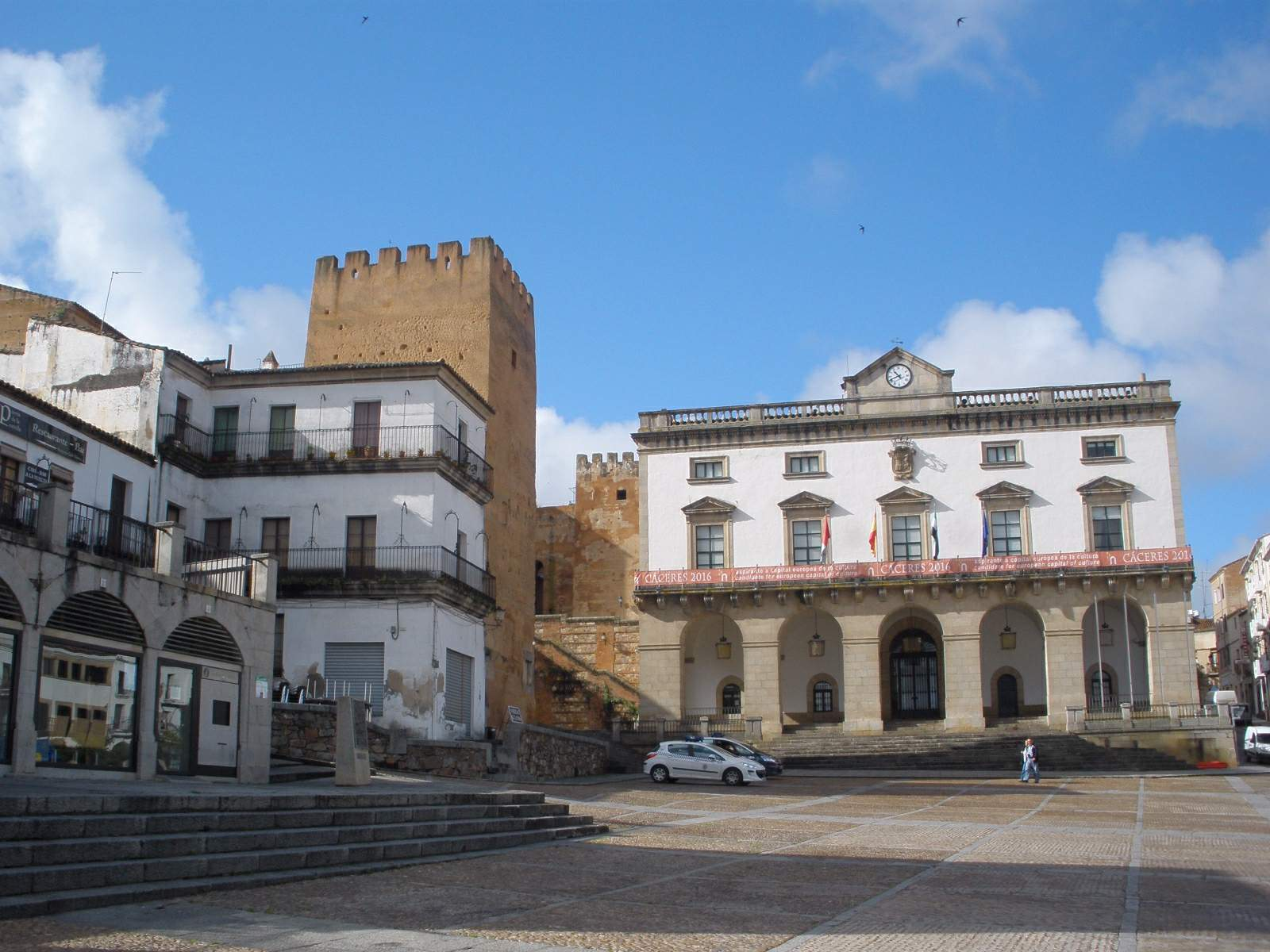
City Hall in the Plaza Mayor

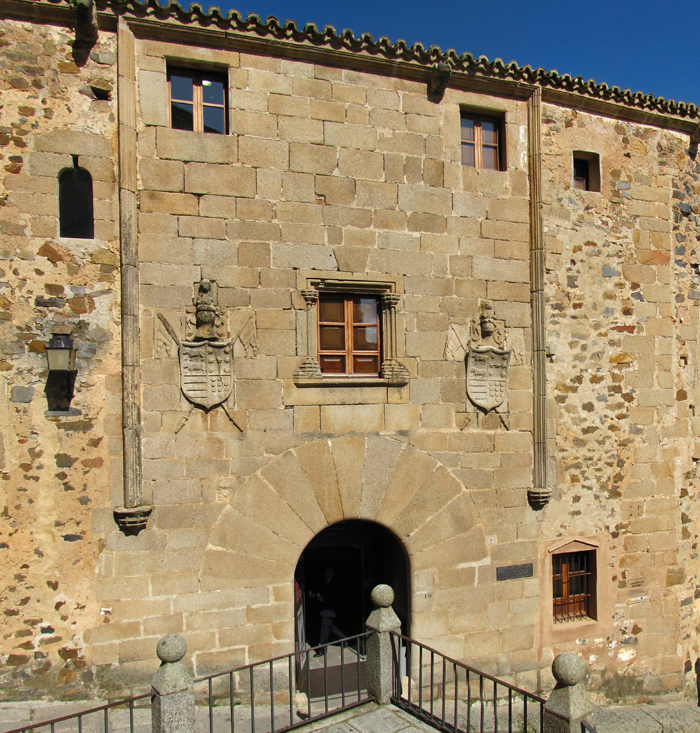
Palacio Casa de los Becerra

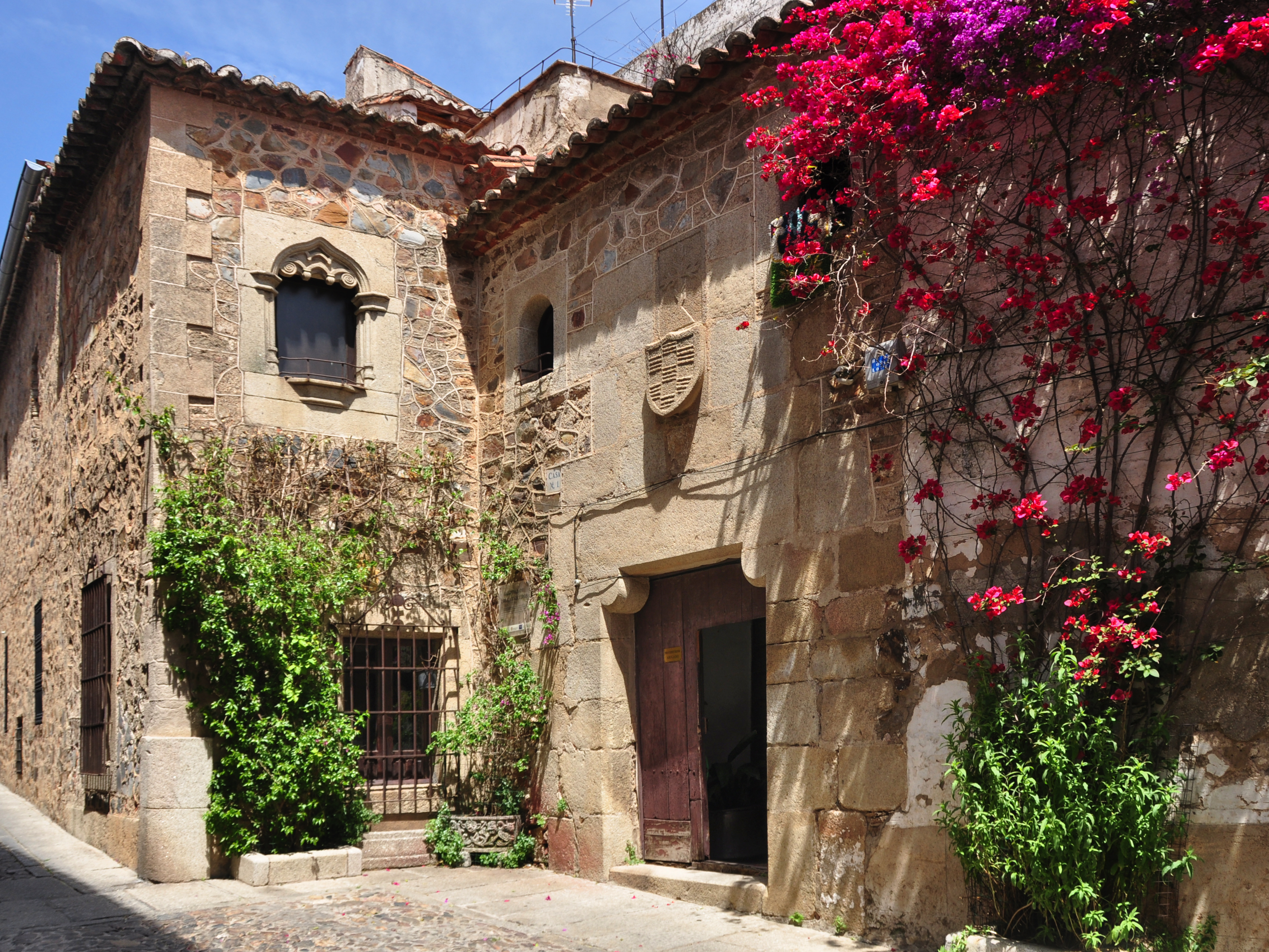
Hospital of the Knights

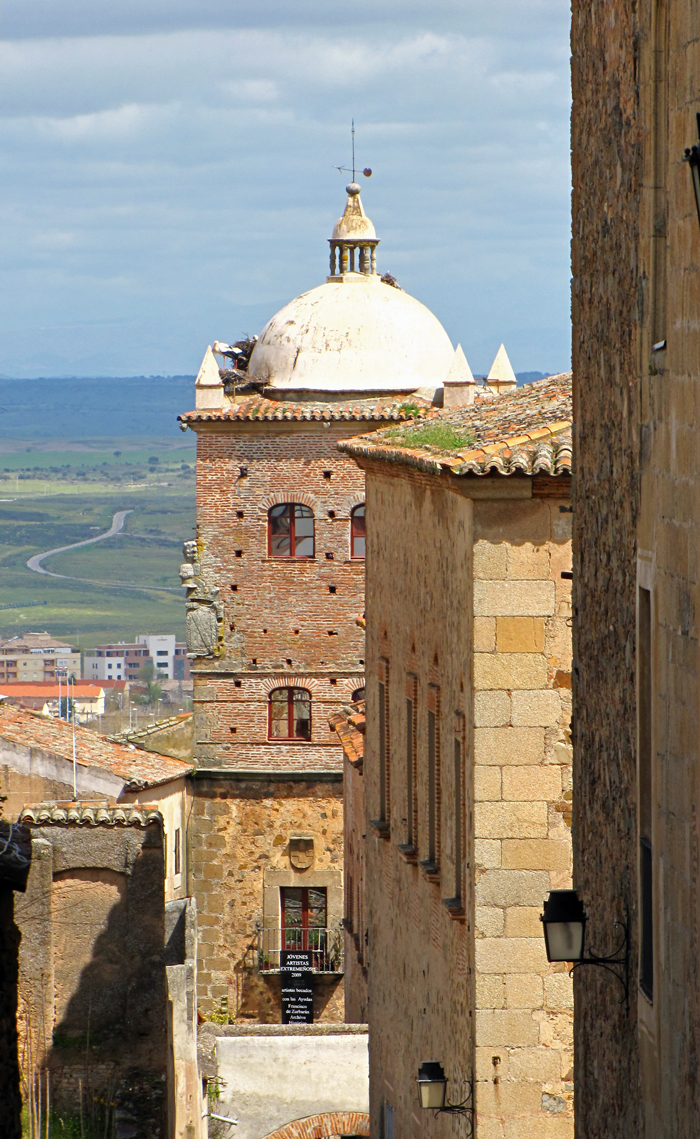
Toledo-Moctezuma Palace

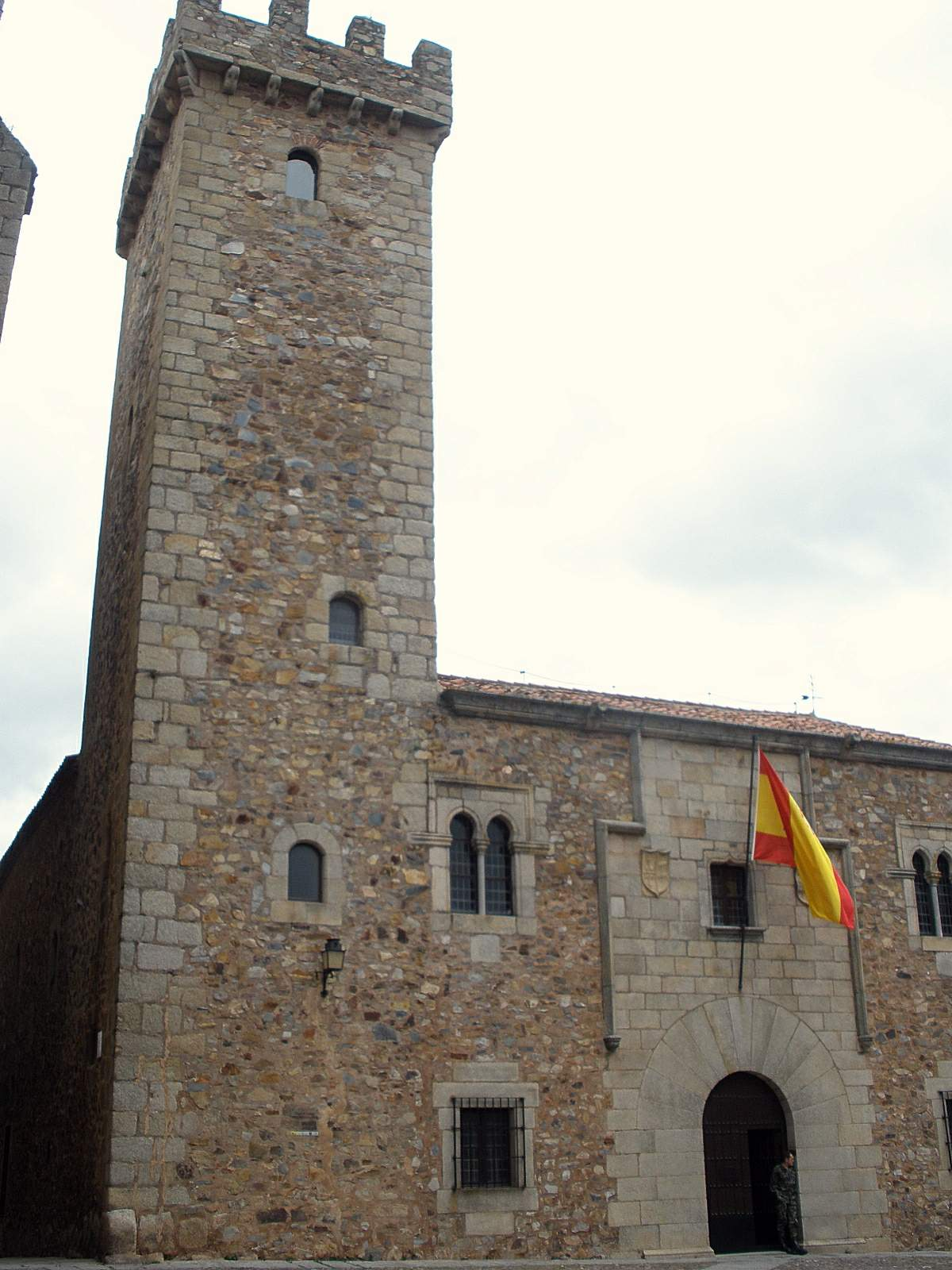
Casa de los Cáceres Ovando

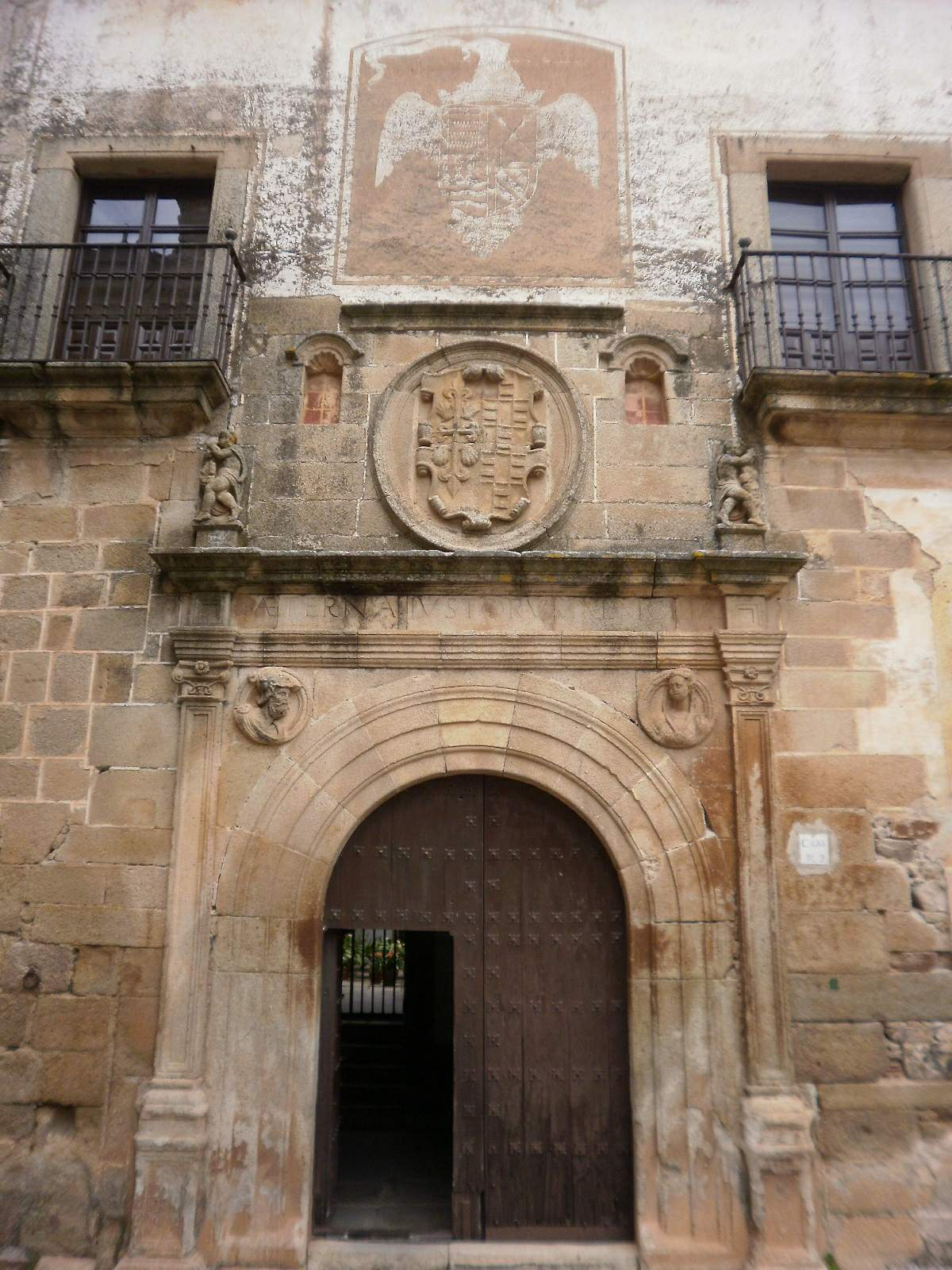
Casa de los Ovando

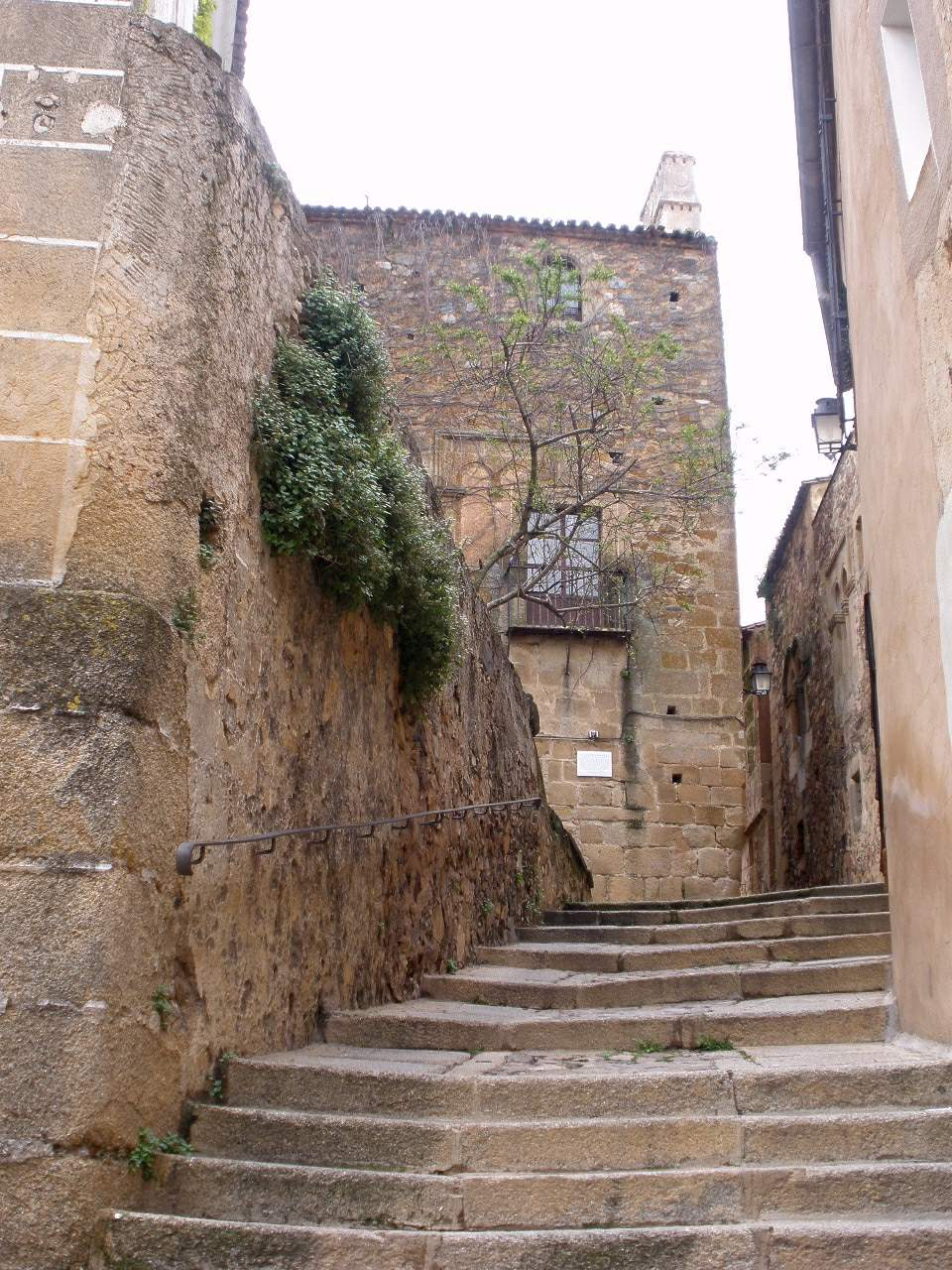
Cuesta de Aldana

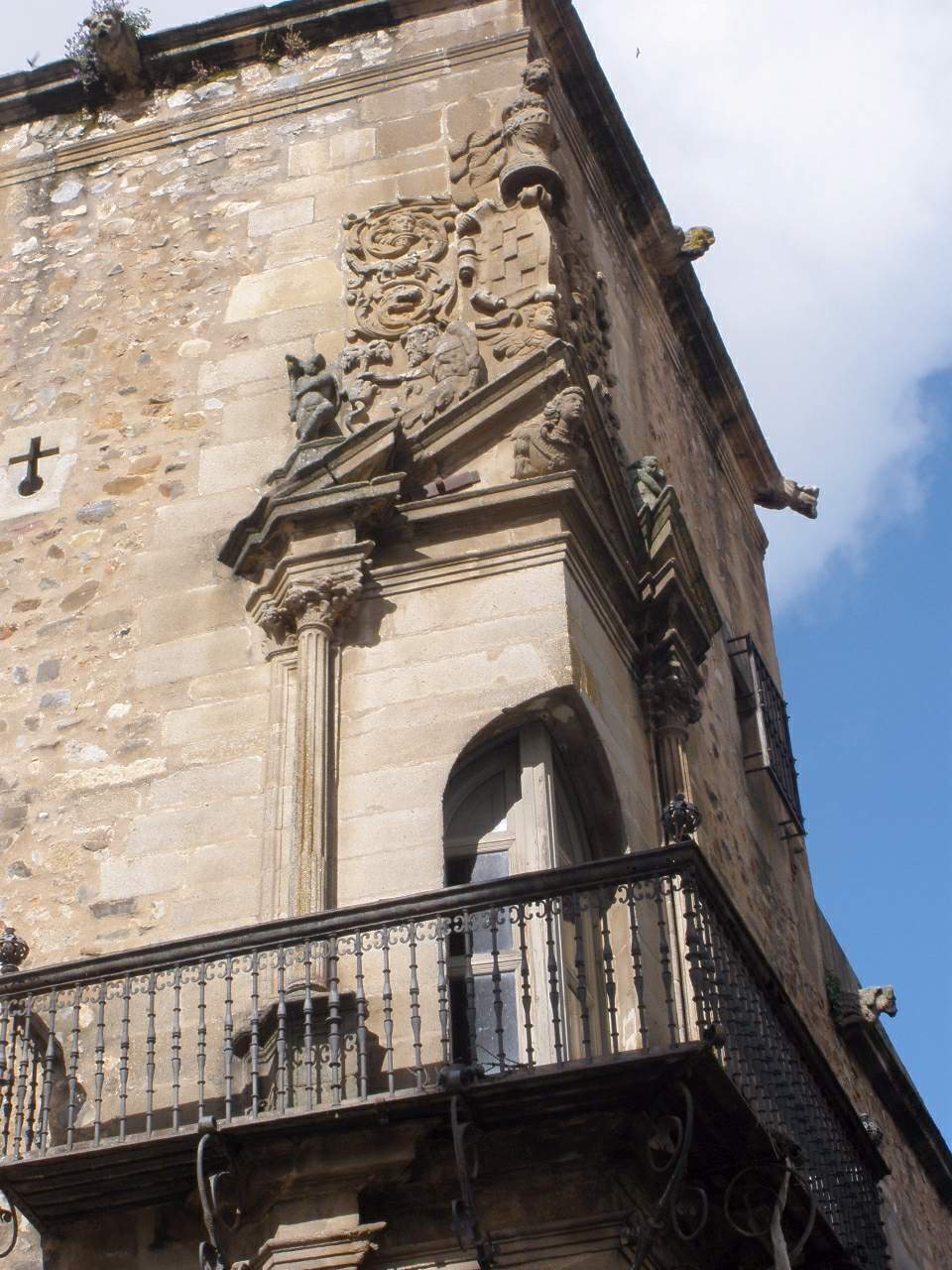
Palacio de Godoy

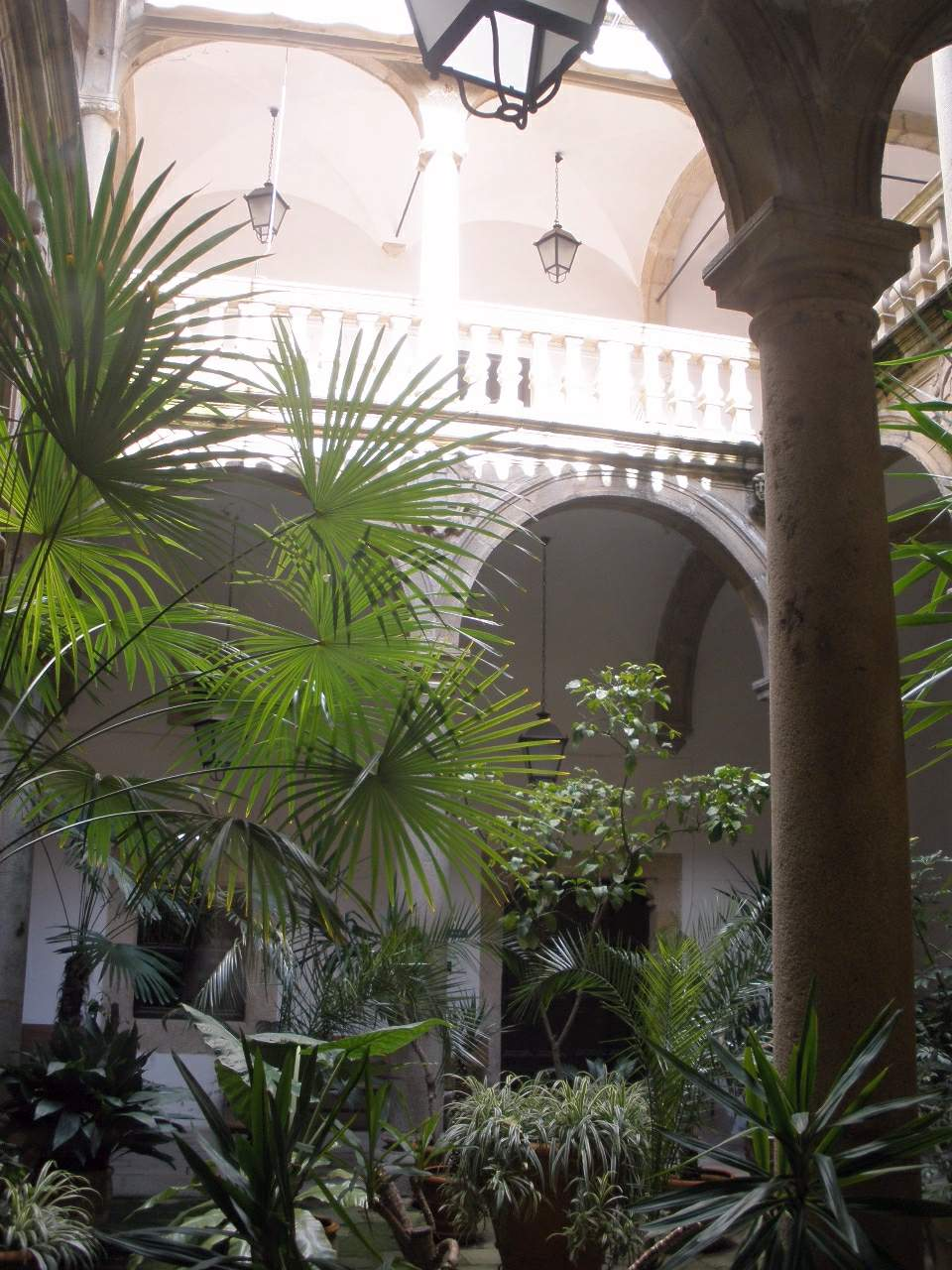
Courtyard of the Palacio de Godoy

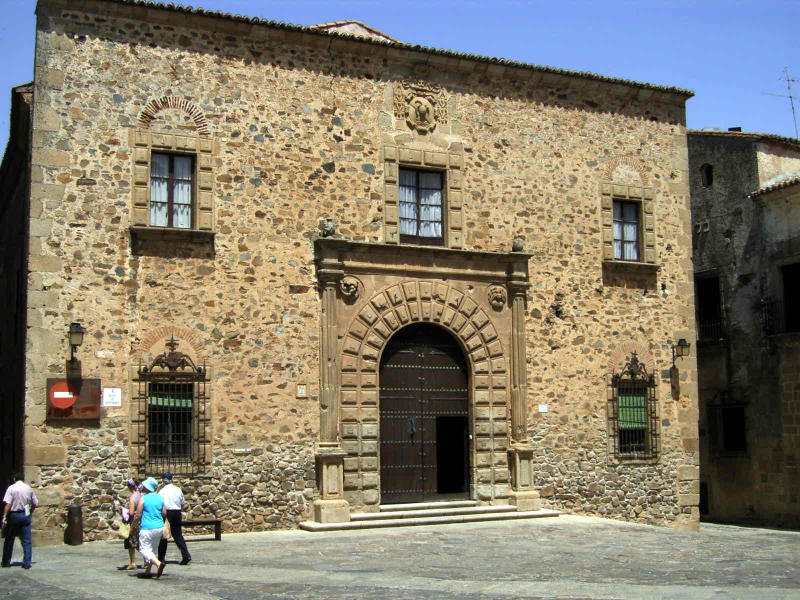
Palacio Episcopal (Episcopal Palace)

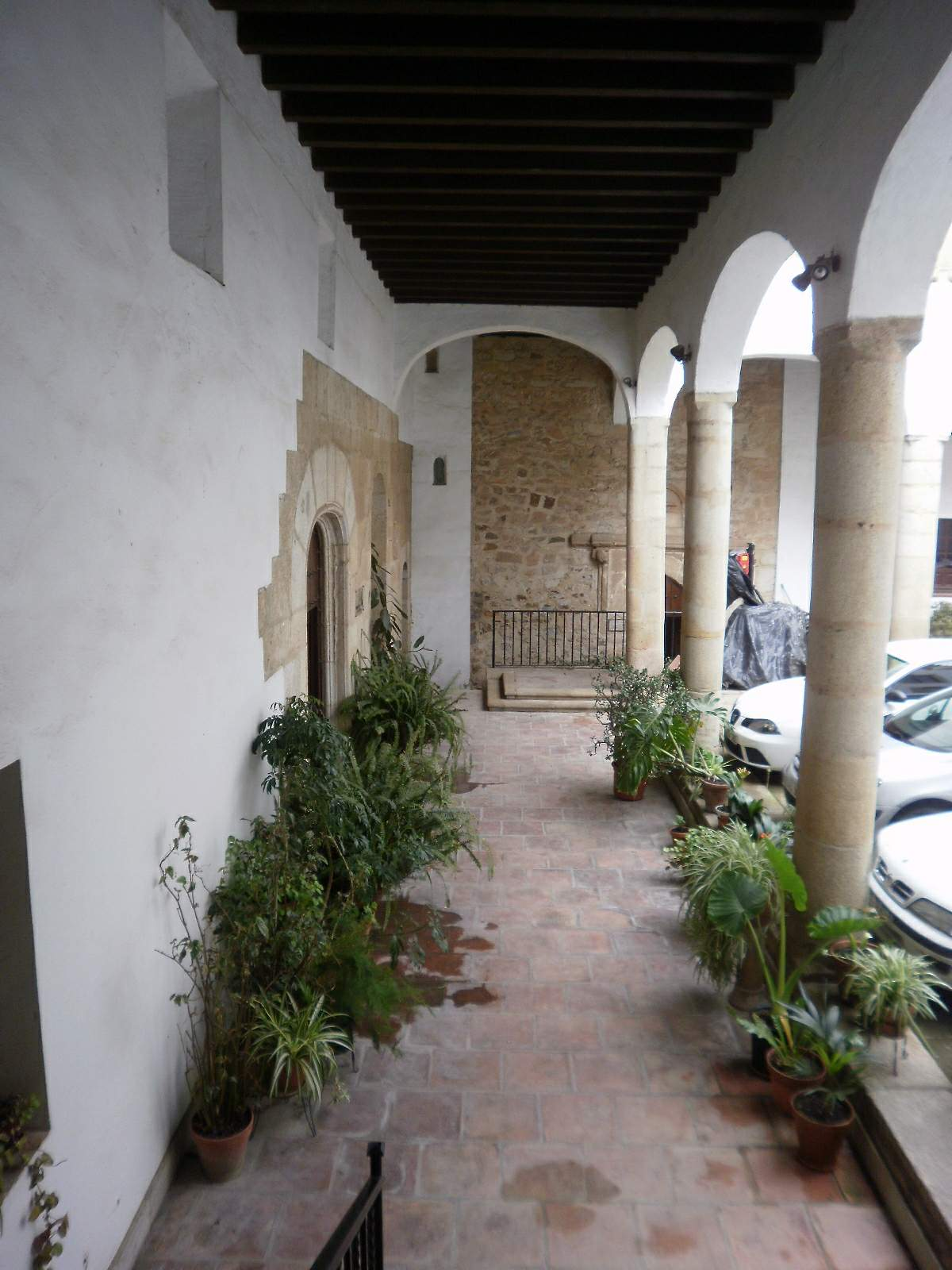
Courtyard of the Palacio Episcopal

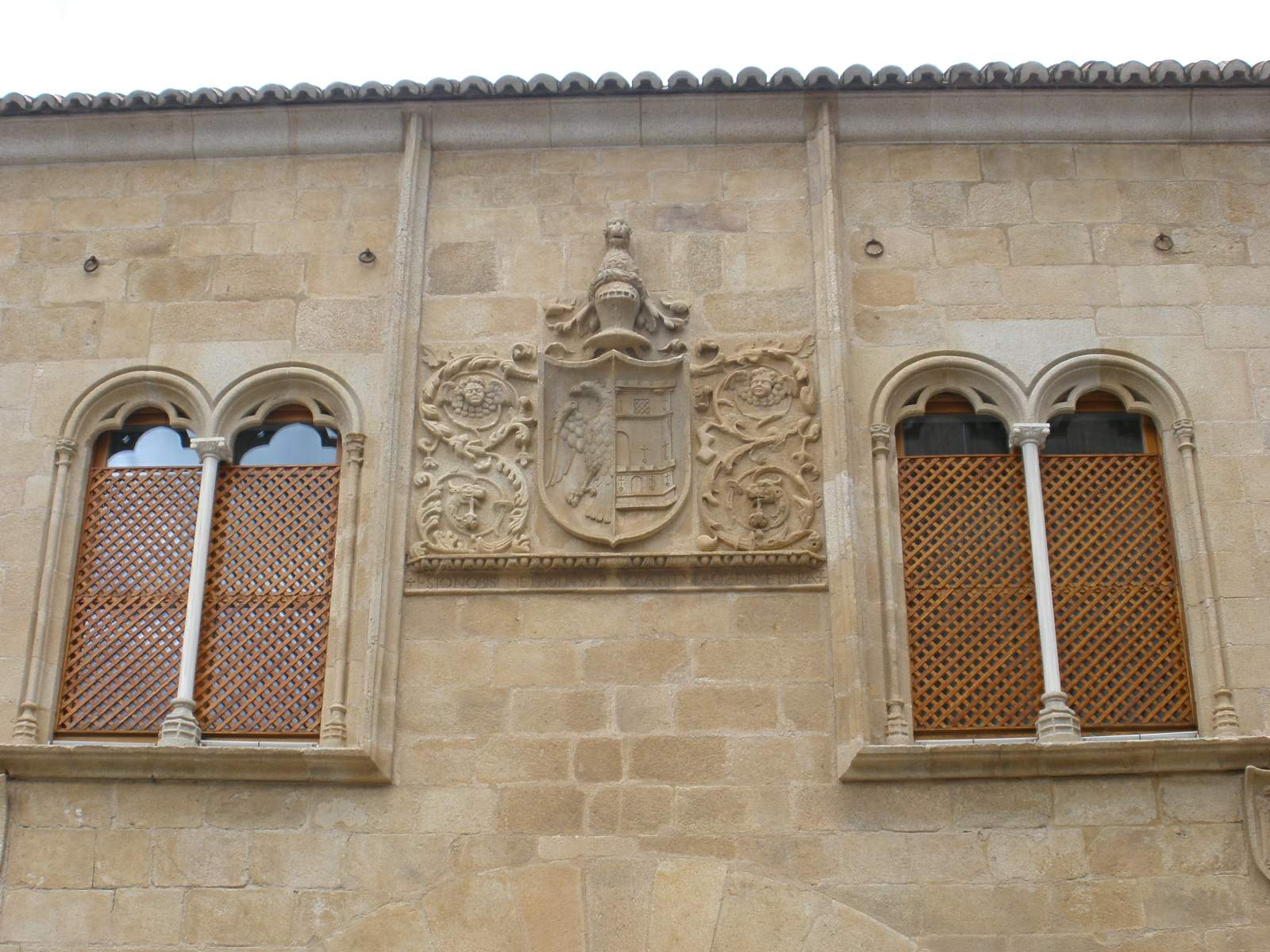
Palacio del Mayorazgo

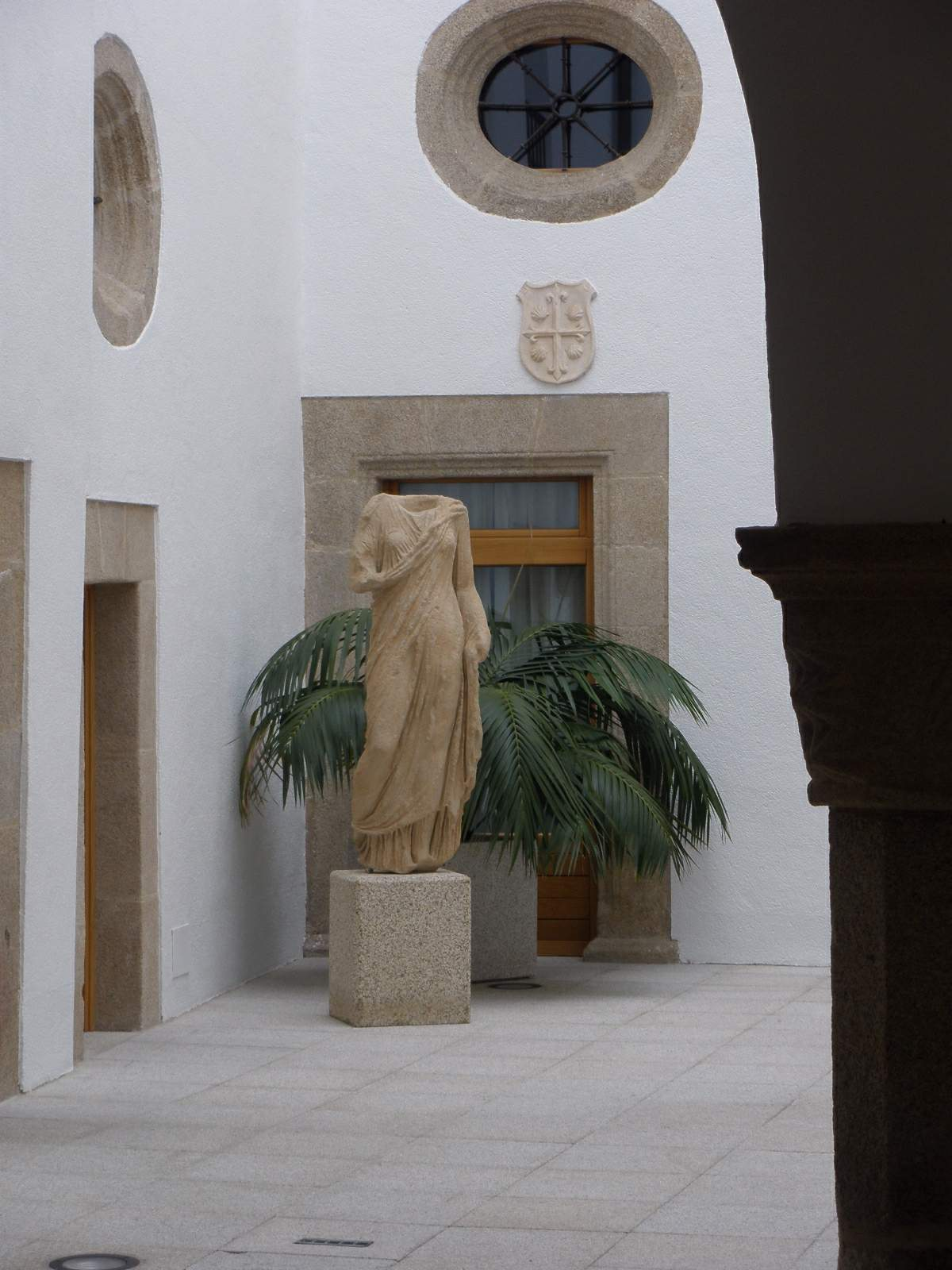
Courtyard of the Palacio Mayorazgo

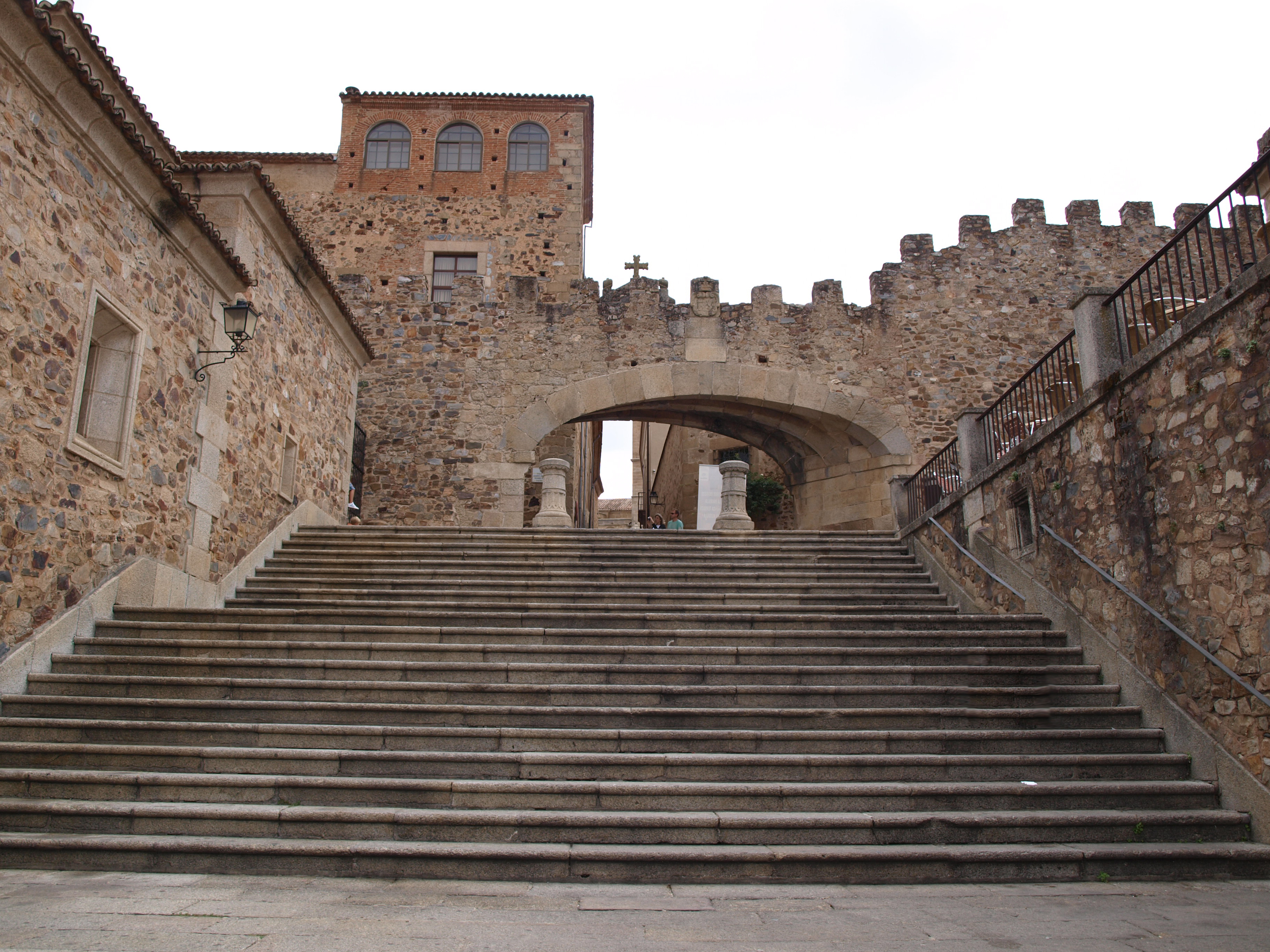
Entrance to the walled Monumental City

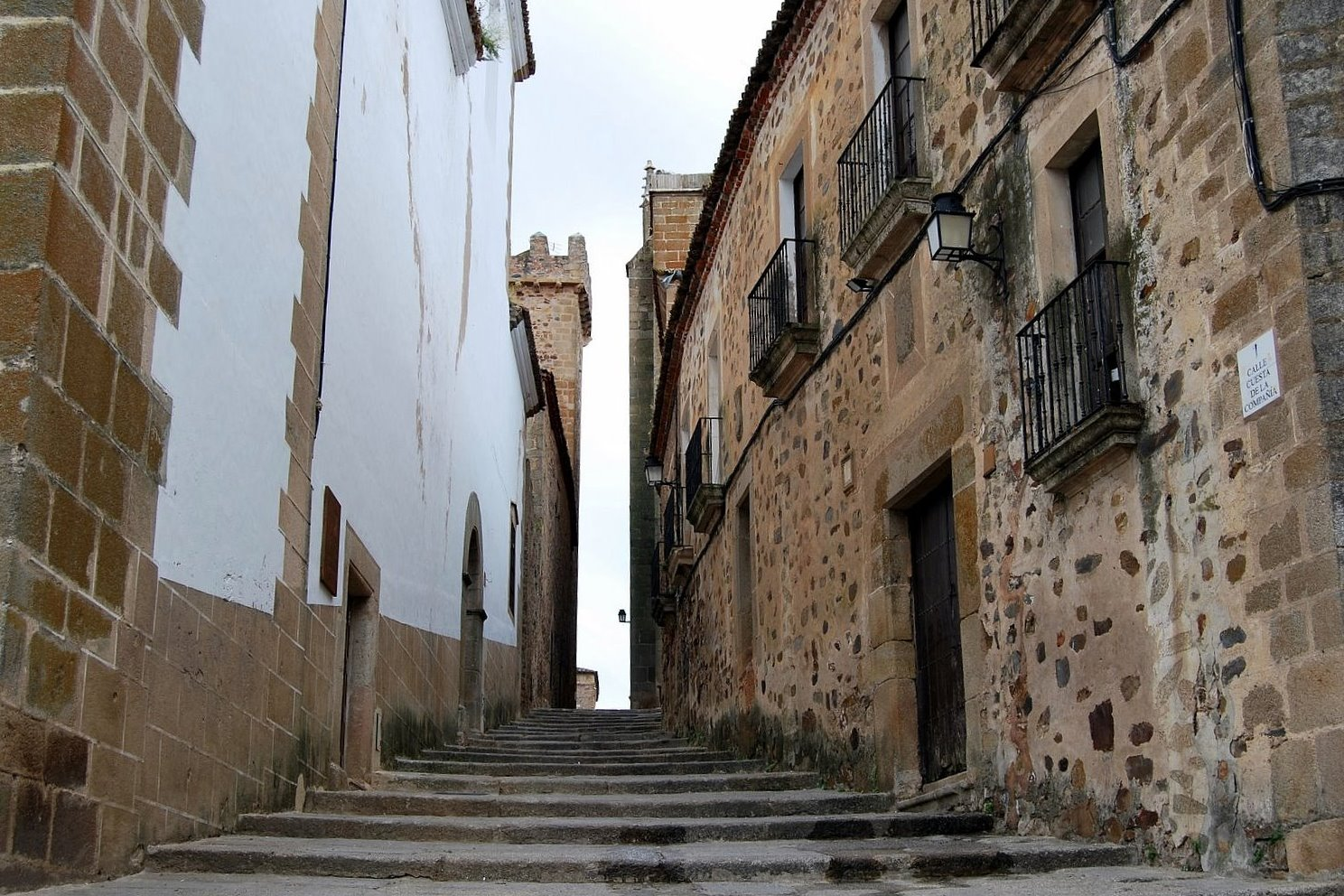
Street in the Monumental City

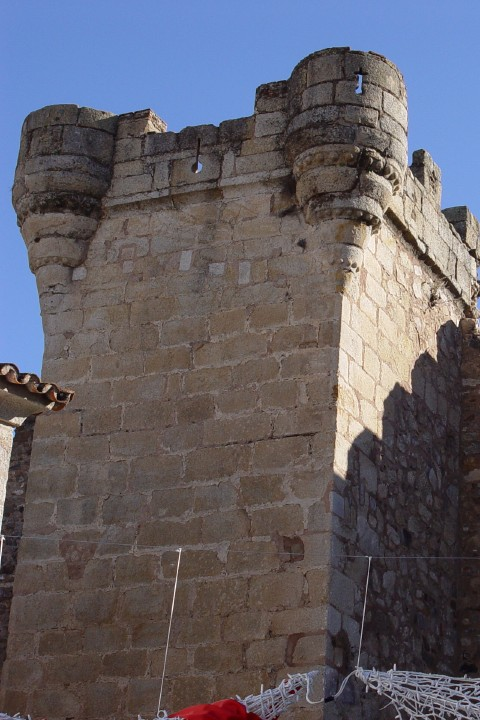
Torre de los Pulpitos

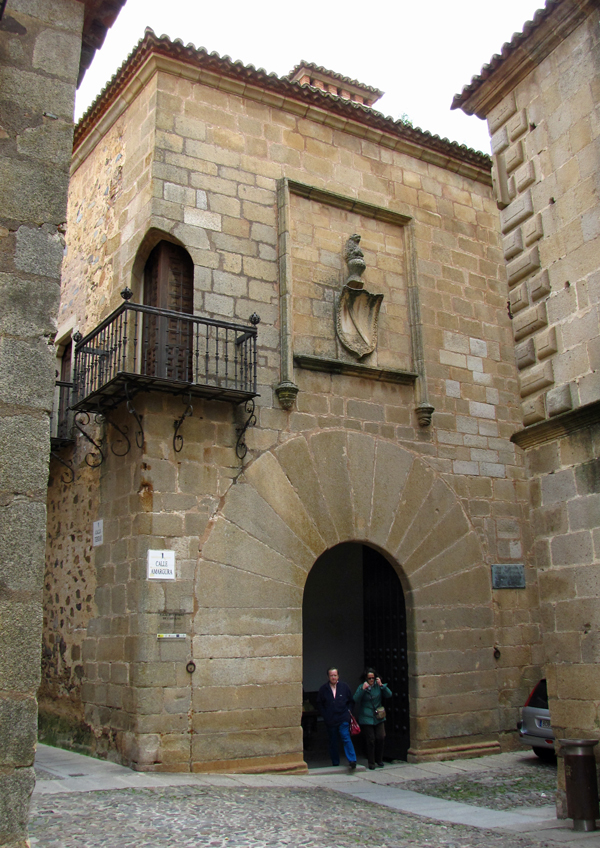
Carvajal Palace

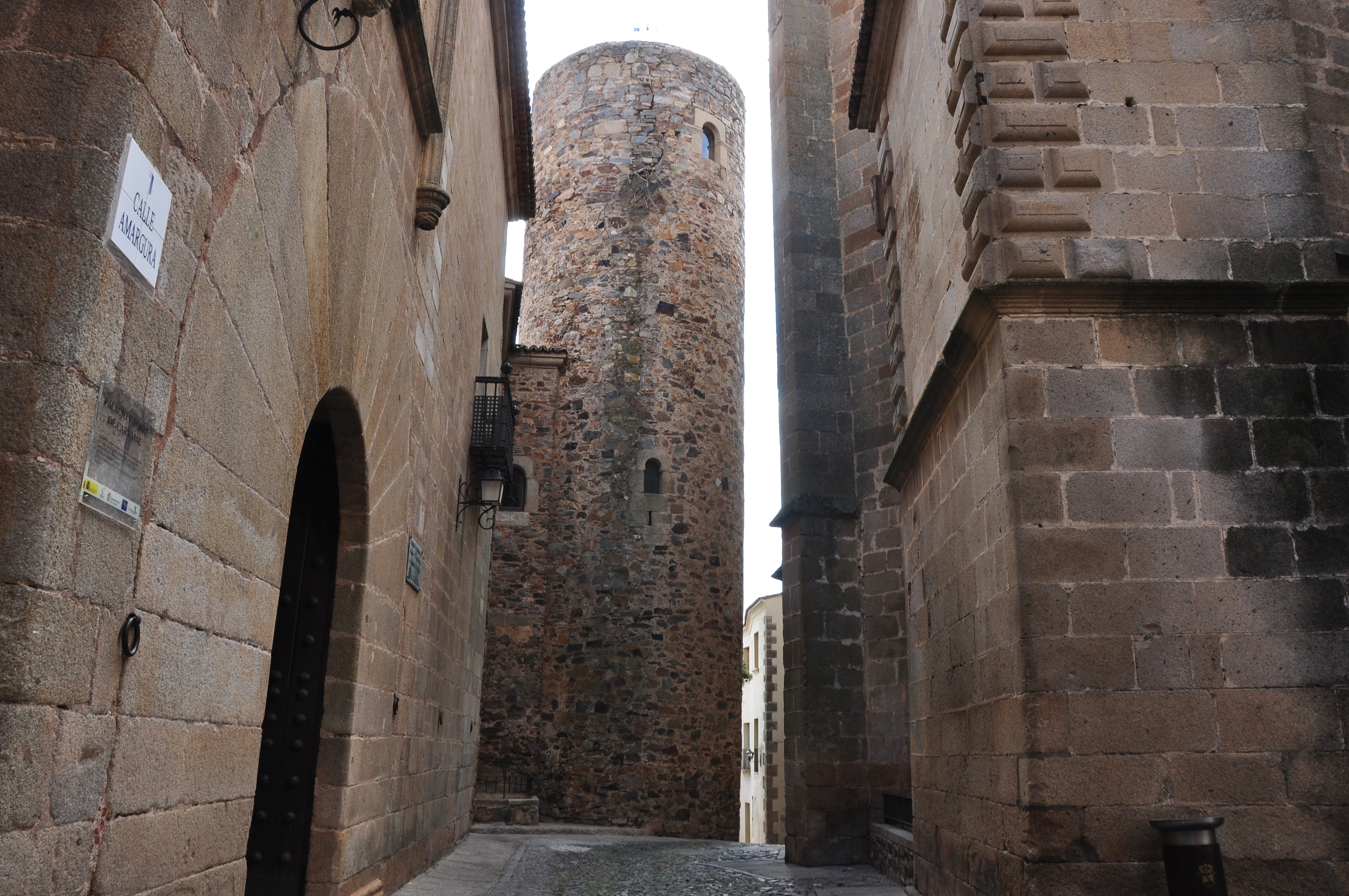
Torre de Carvajal

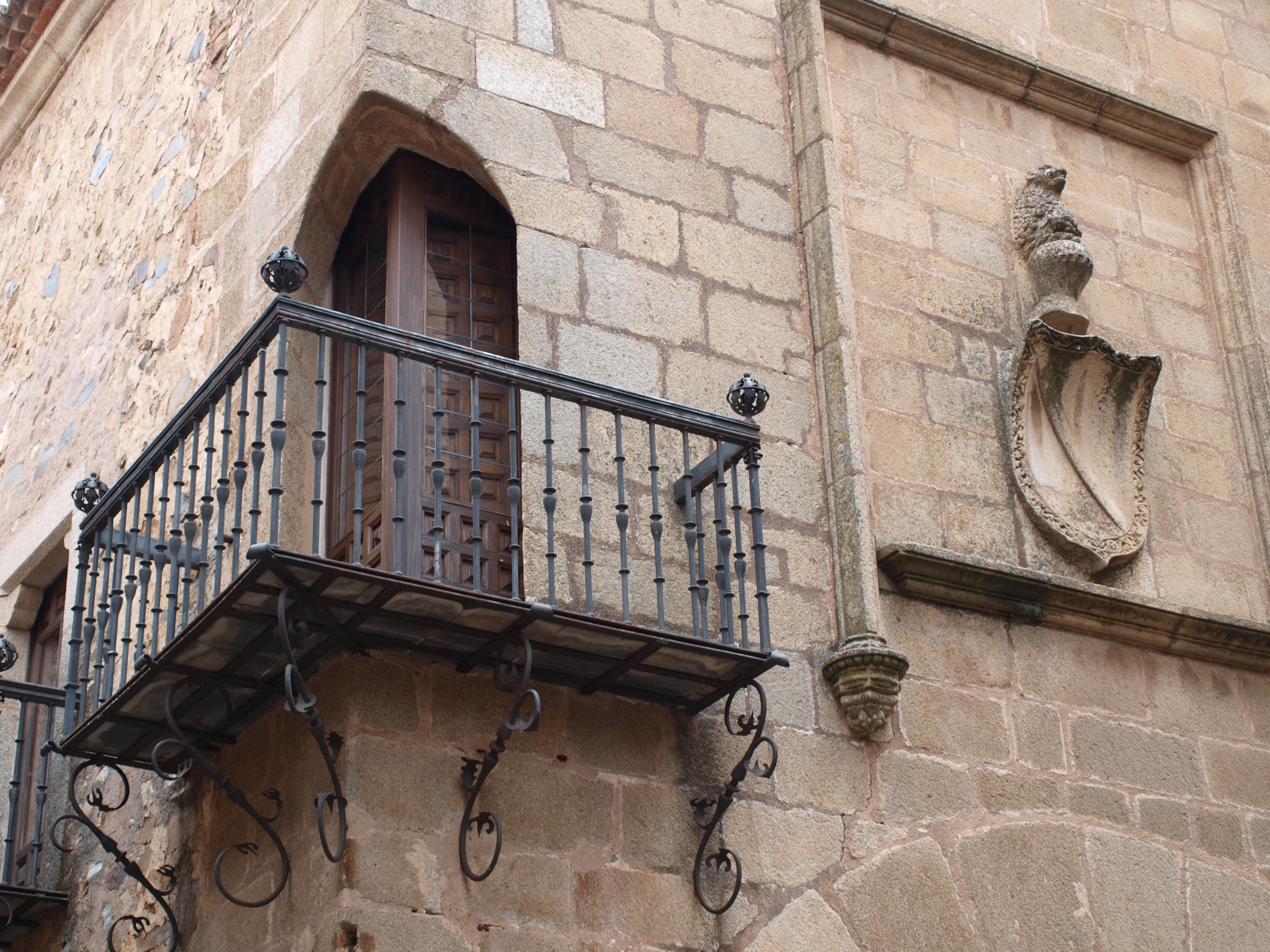
Detail of corner balcony of the Palacio Carvajal

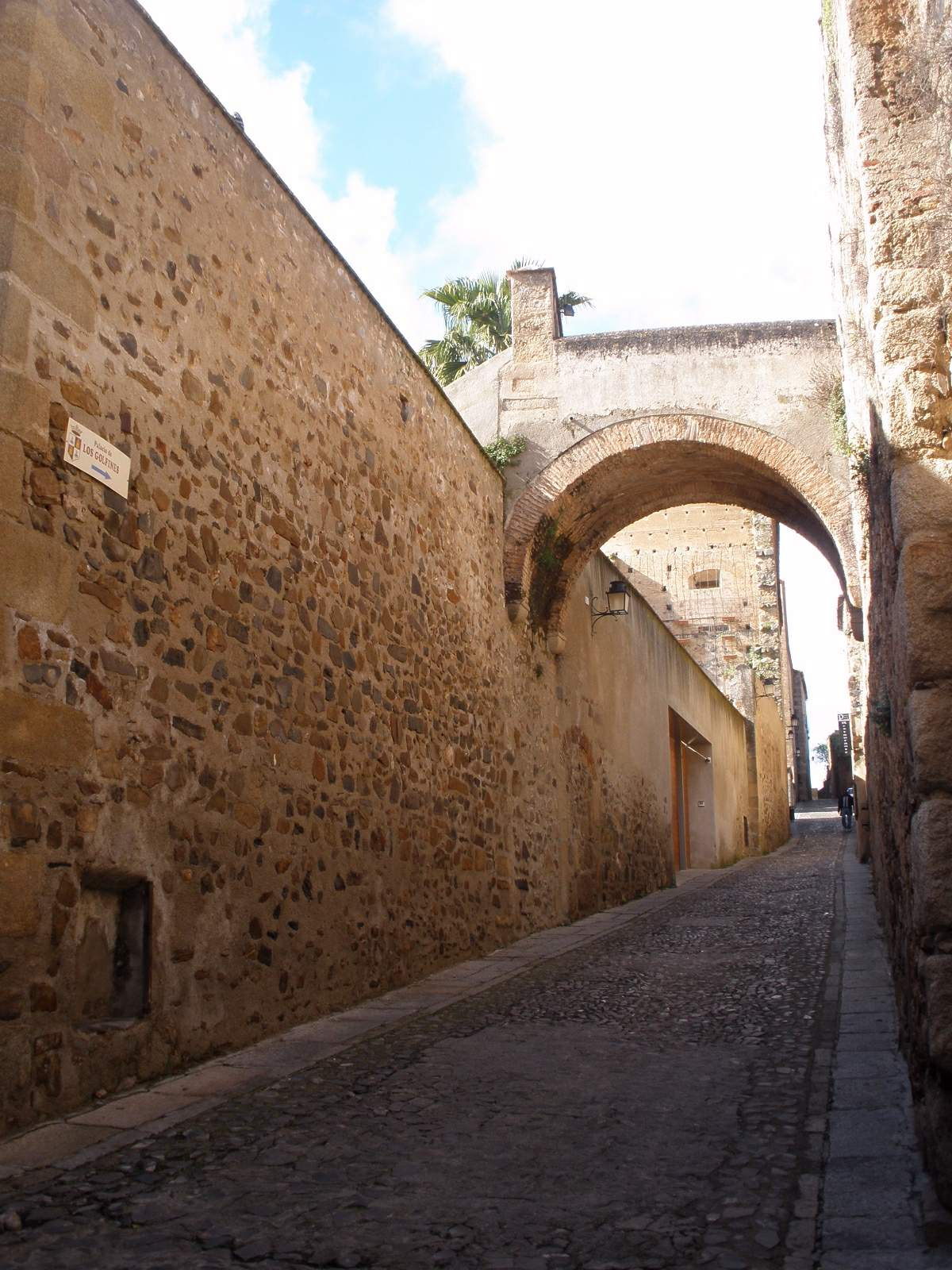
Aldarve Obispo Alvarez de Castro

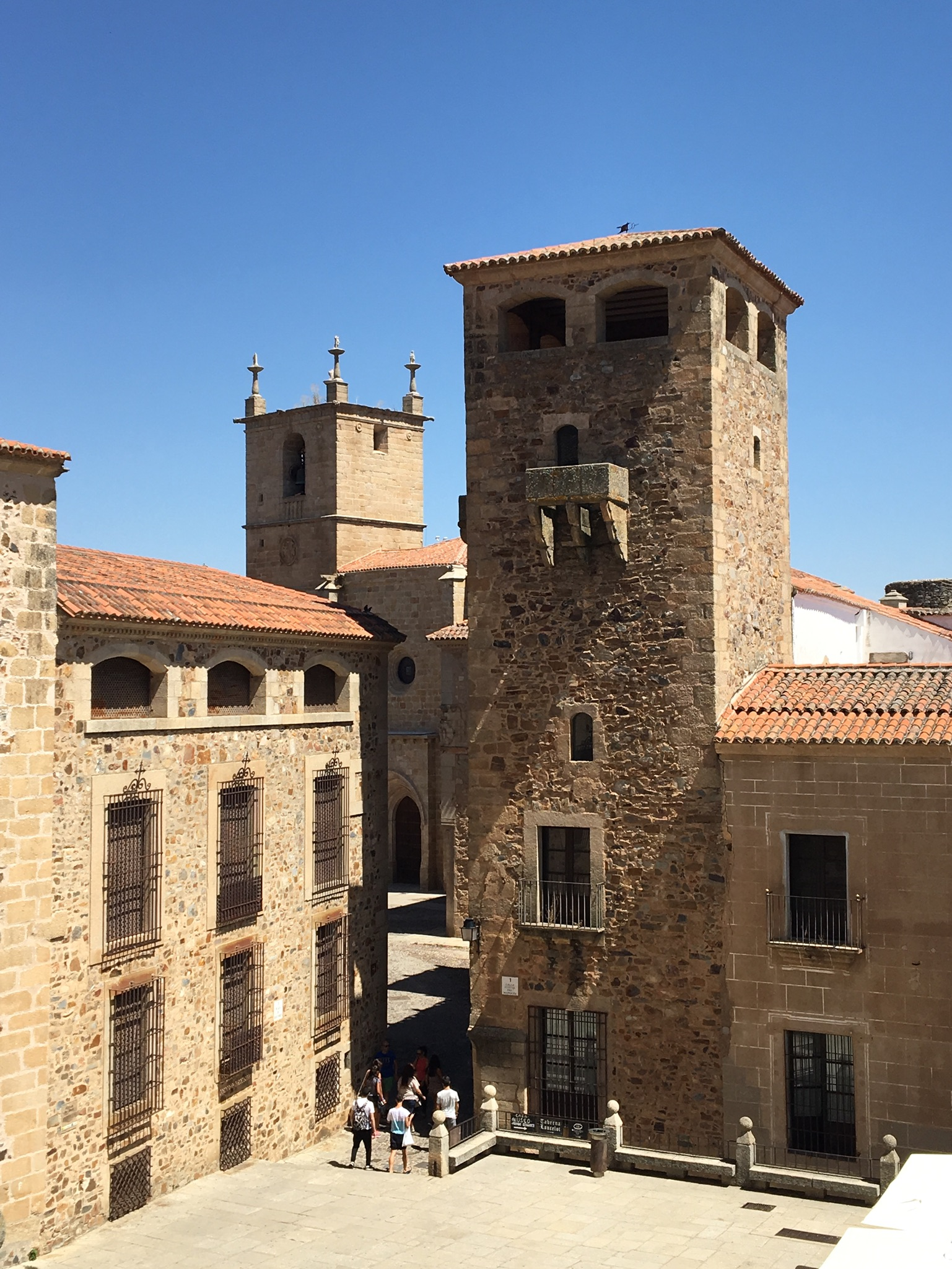
Plaza de San Jorge

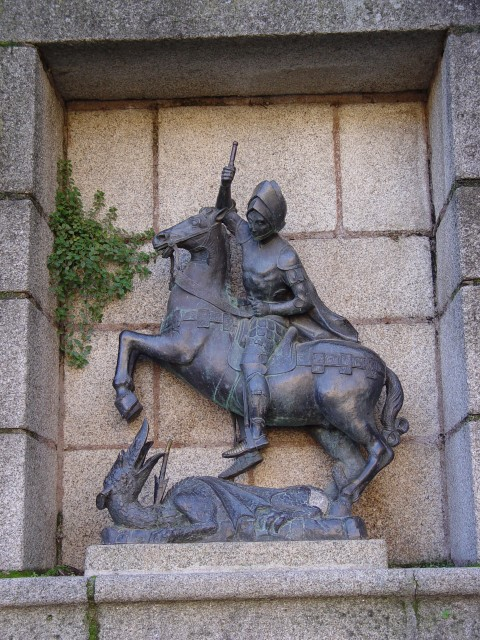
Plaza de San Jorge, Saint George on horseback slaying a dragon

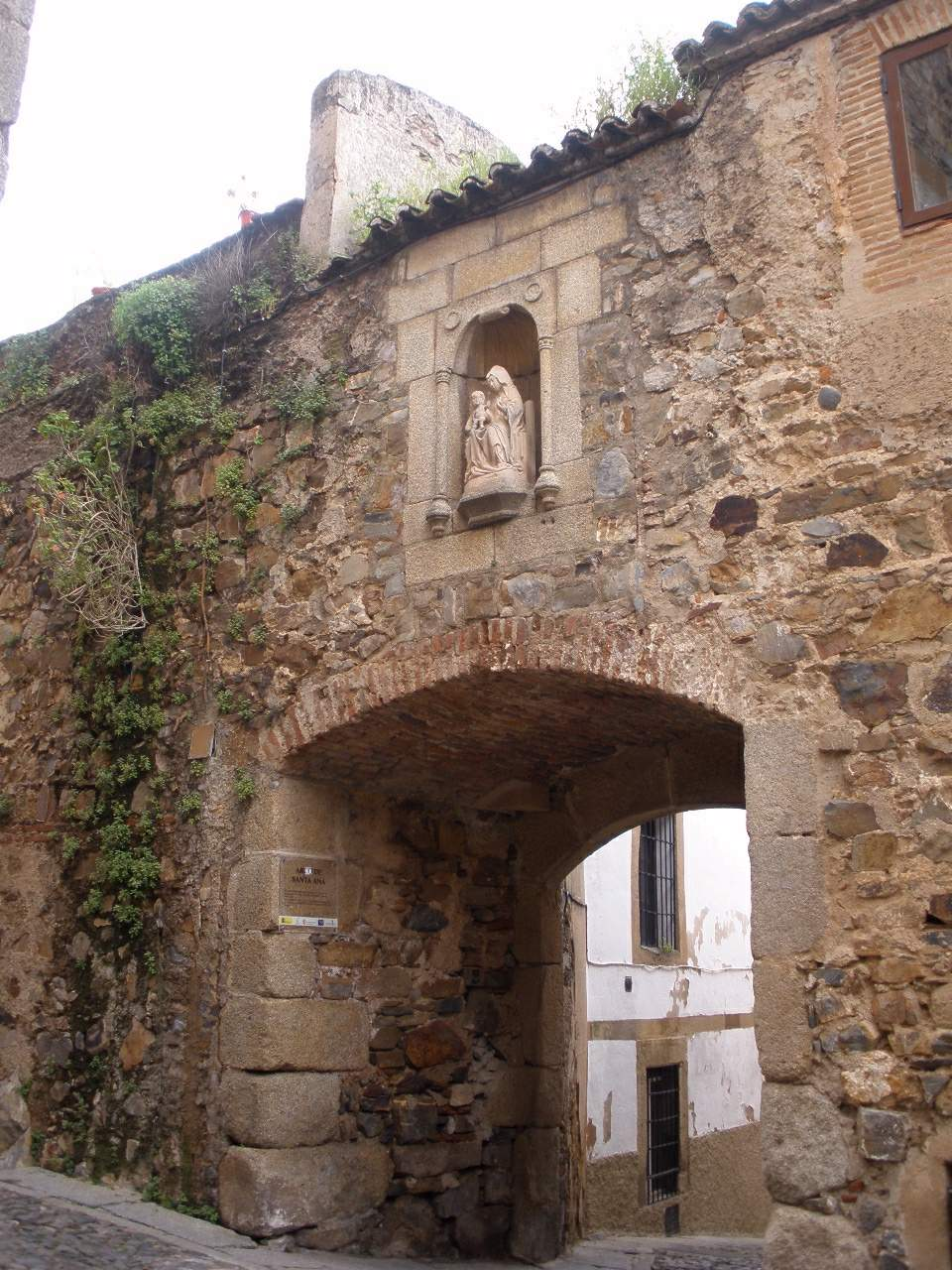
Arco de Santa Ana

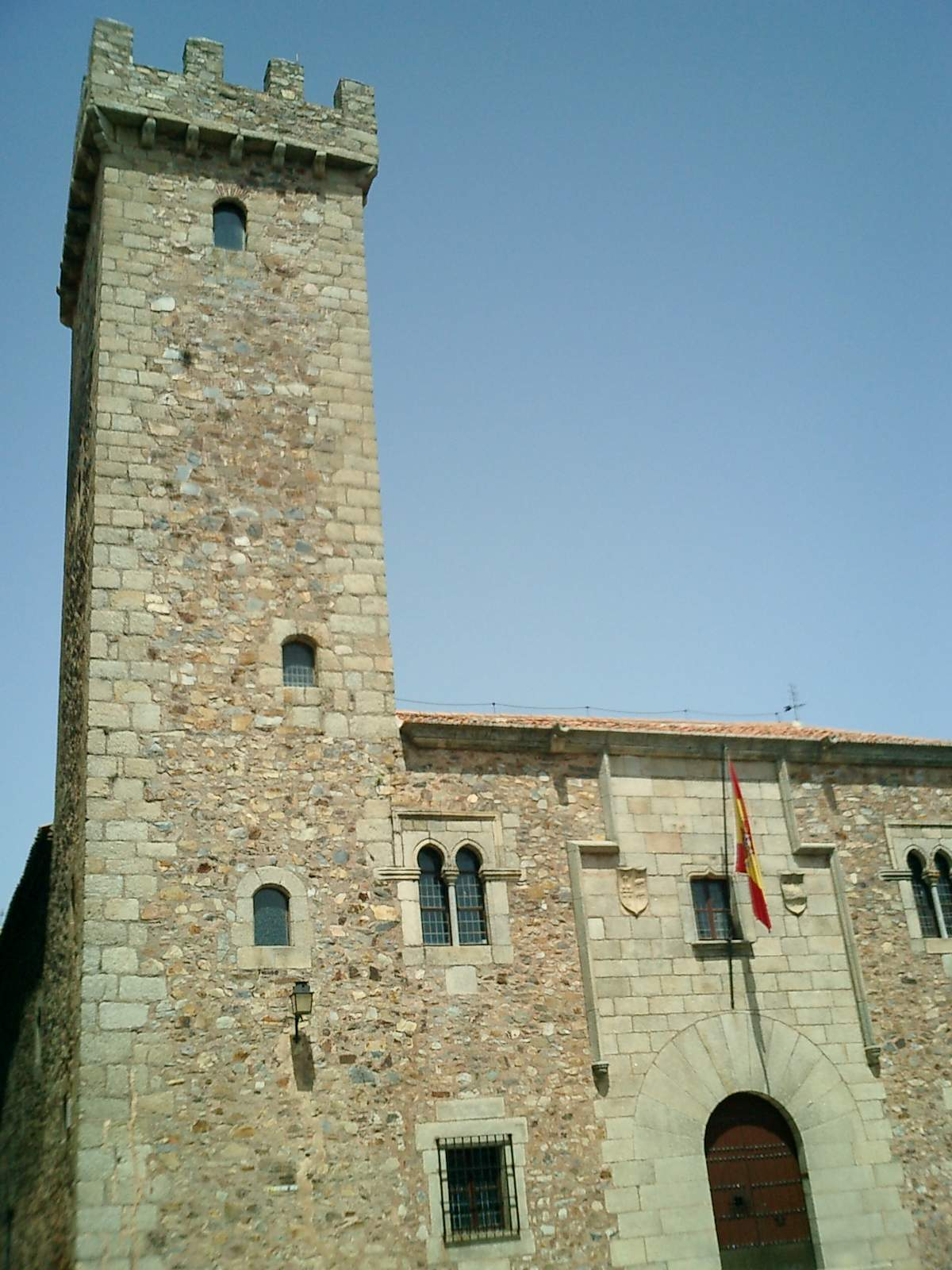
Tower of the Palacio de las Ciguenas (Stork Palace)

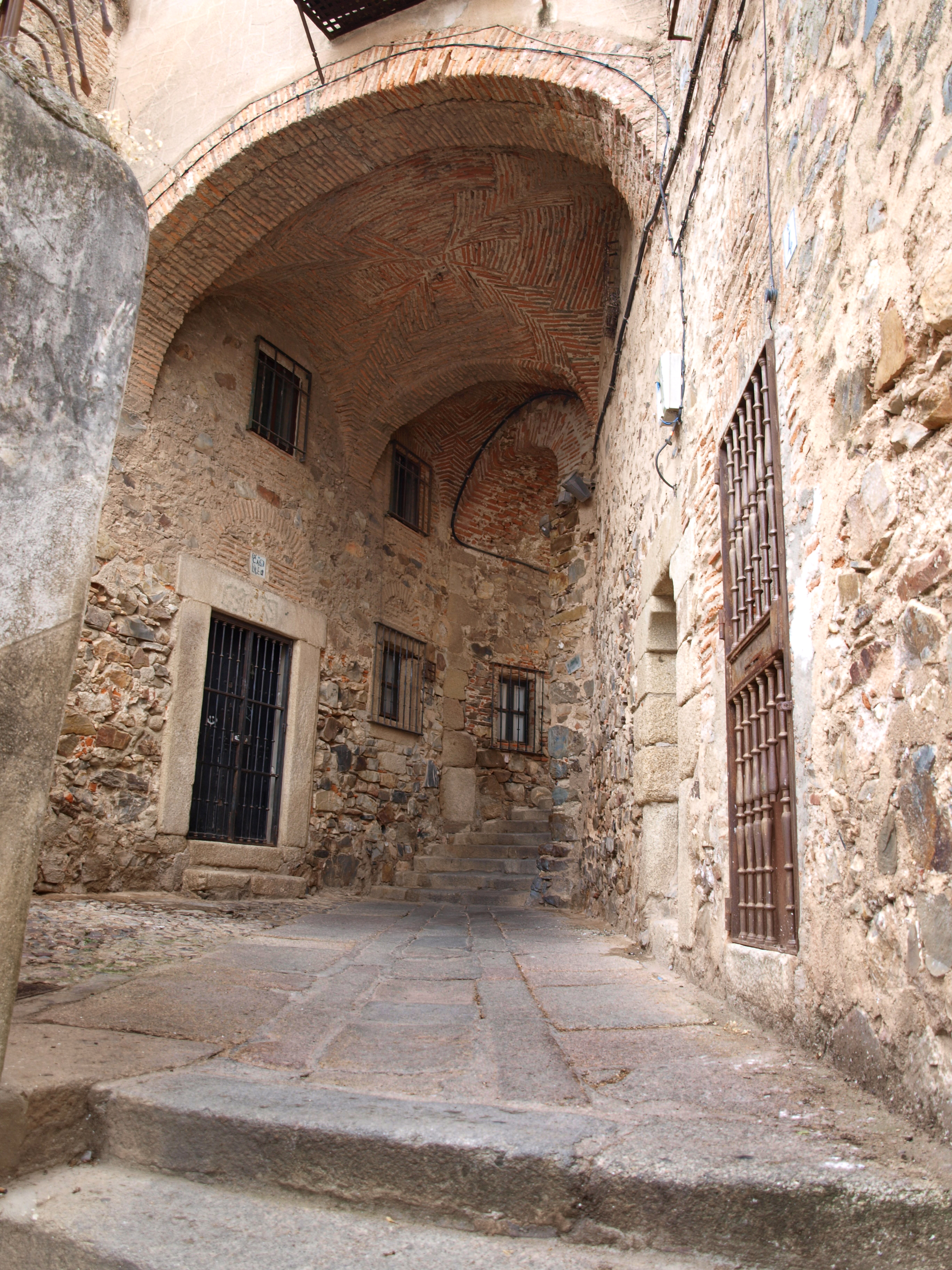
Corner in the Monumental City

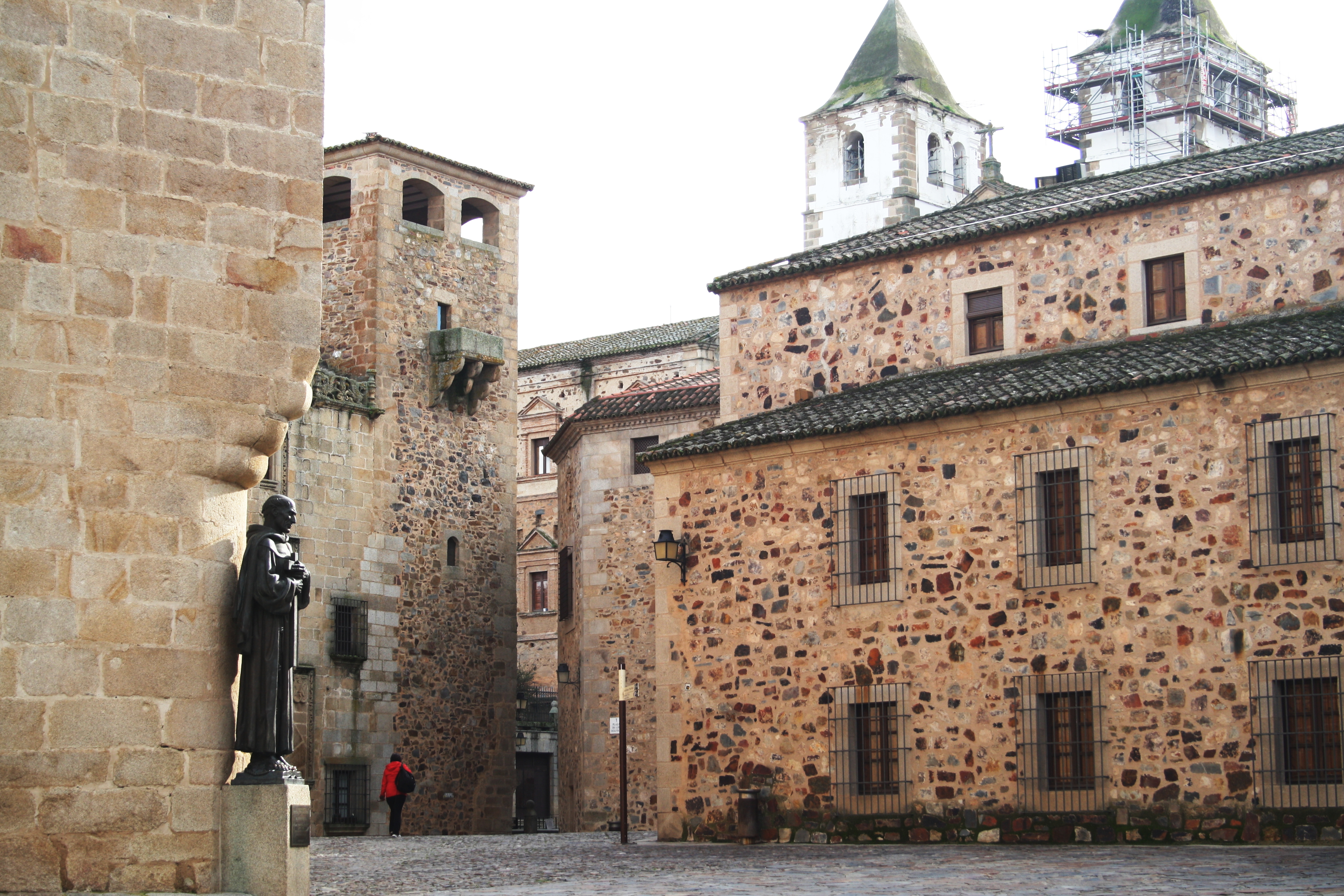
A small plaza in the Monumental City

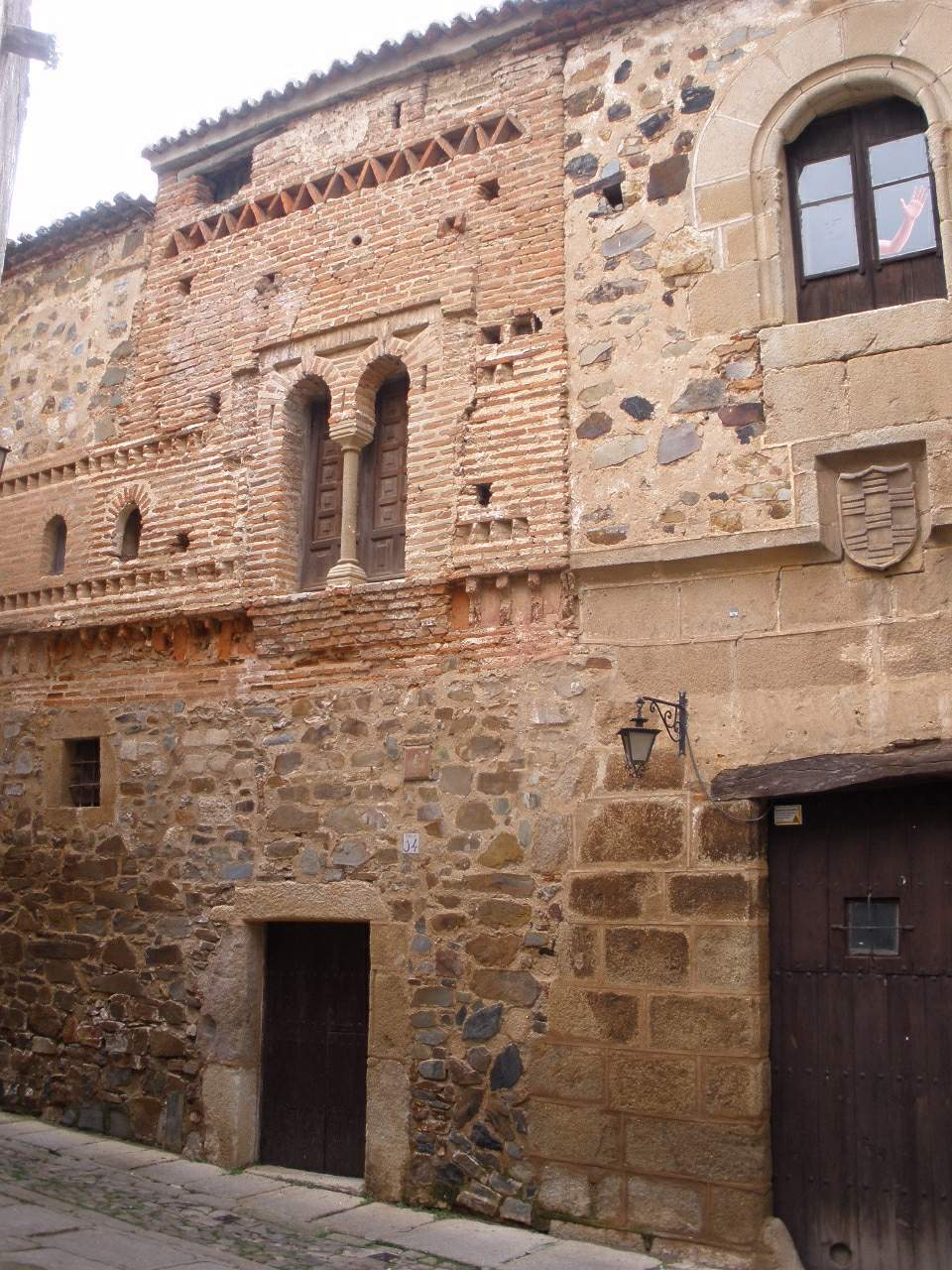
Casa Mudejar, built in an architectural style, influenced by Islamic tradition, that also reflected contemporary European styles.

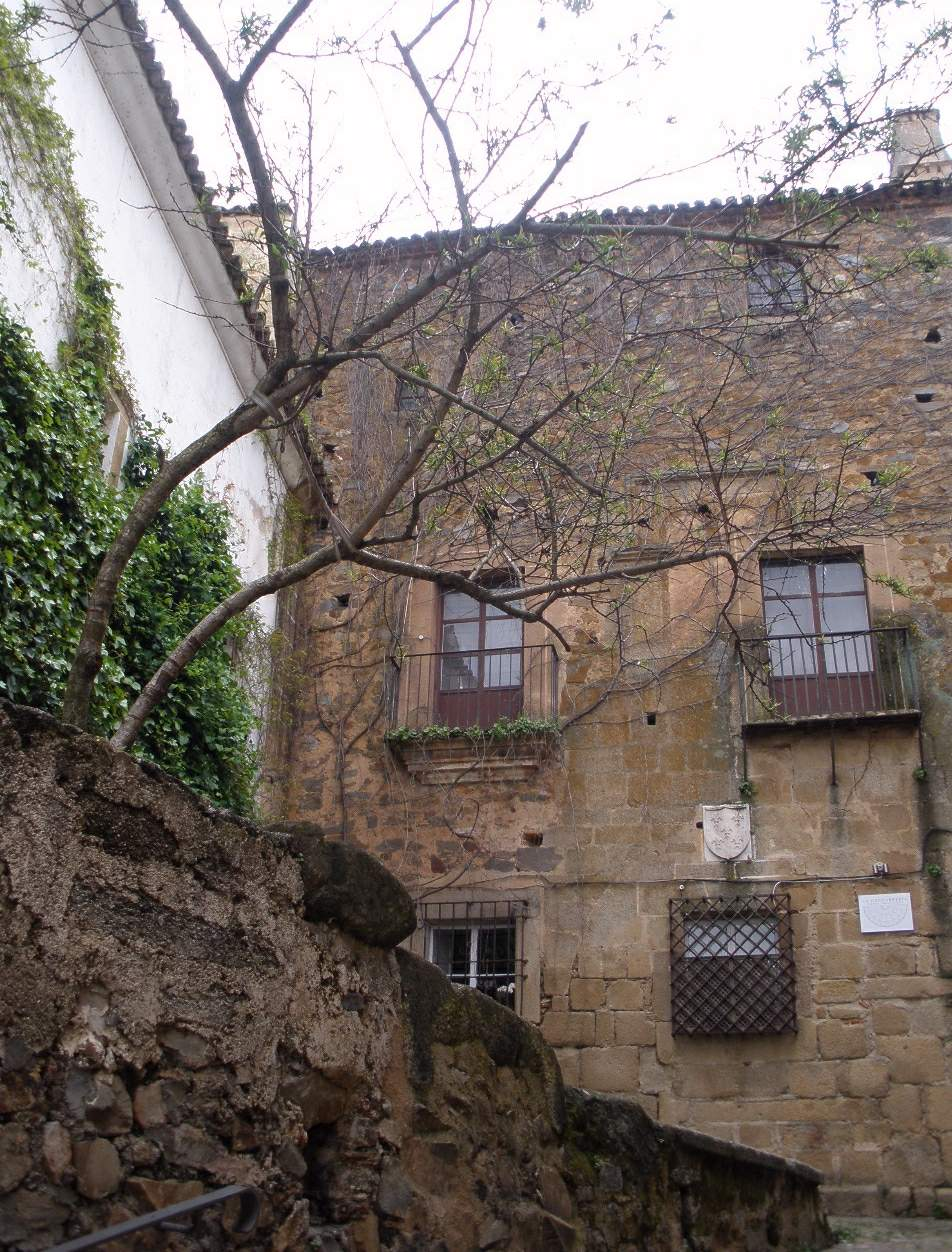
Casa de Aldana

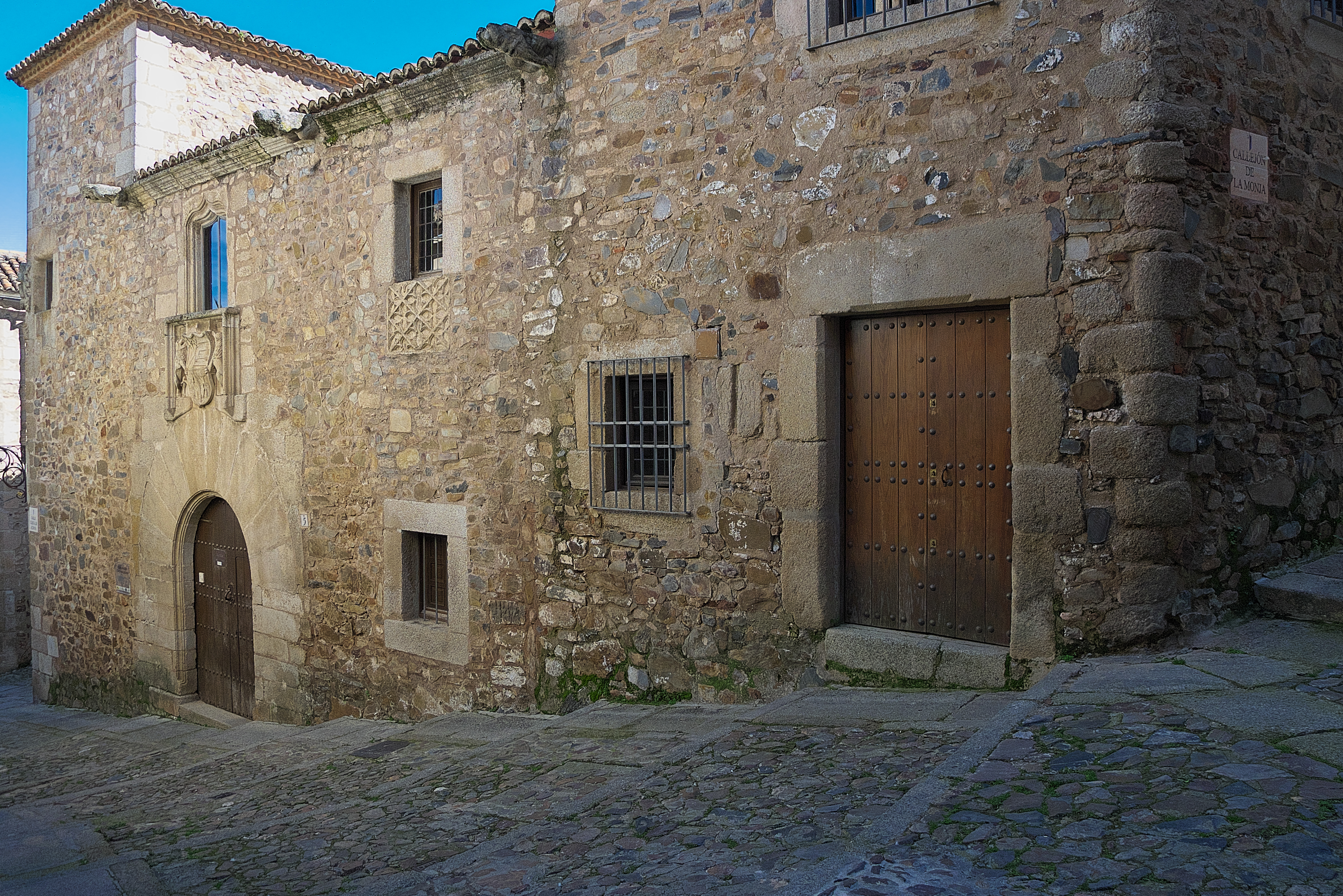
Casa de los Cáceres-Nidos

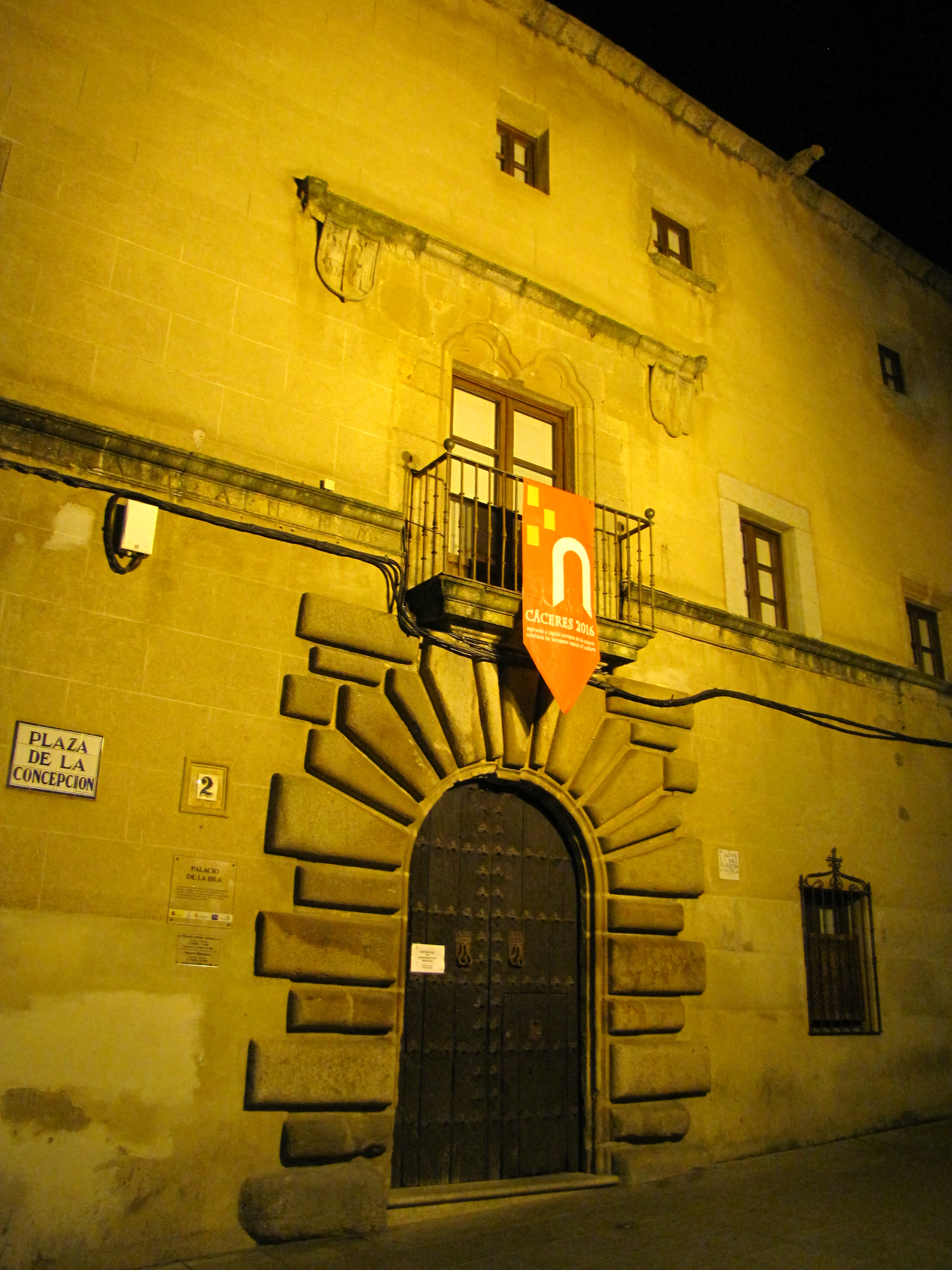
Palacio de la Isla

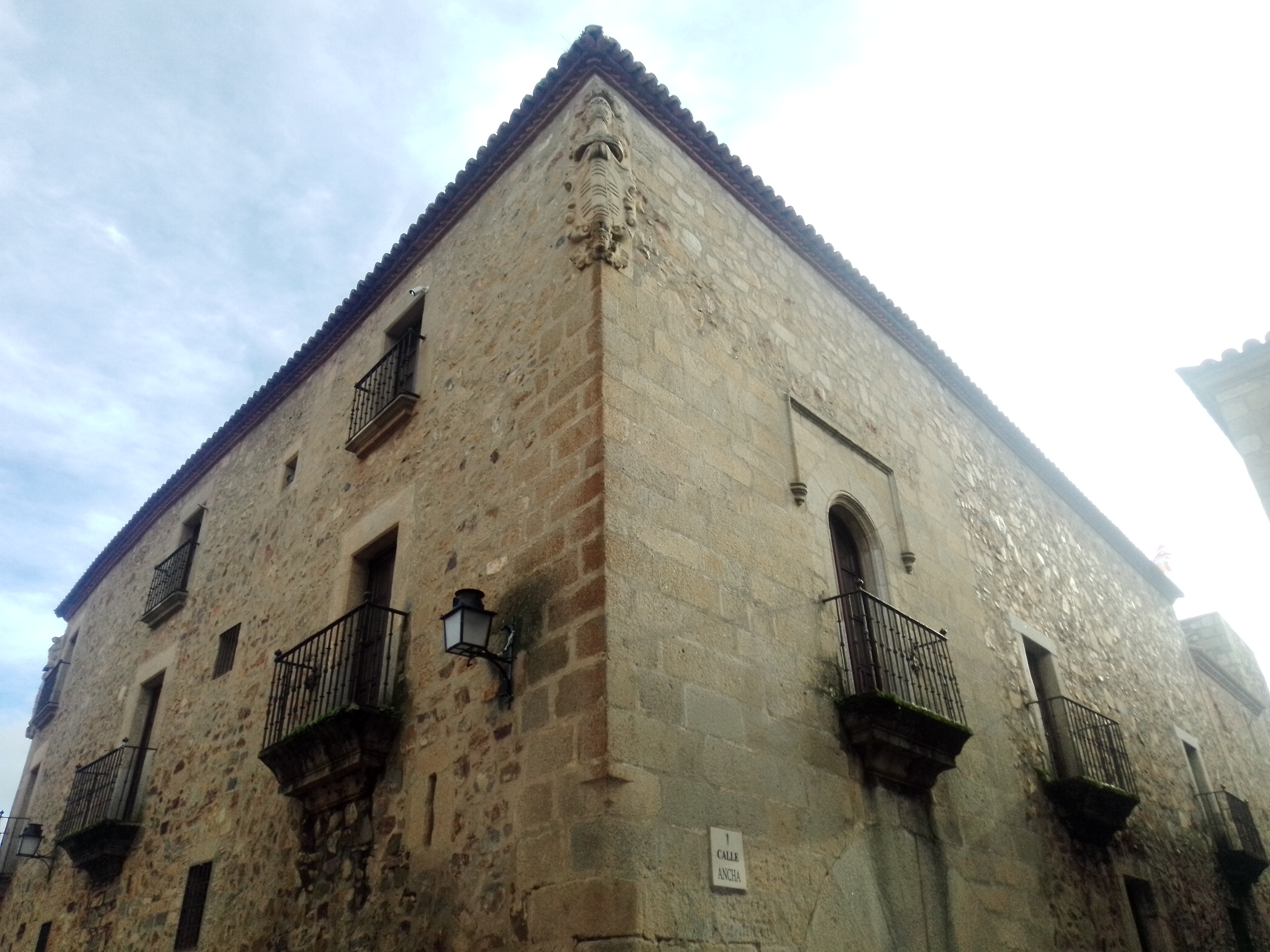
Casa de Lorenzo de Ulloa

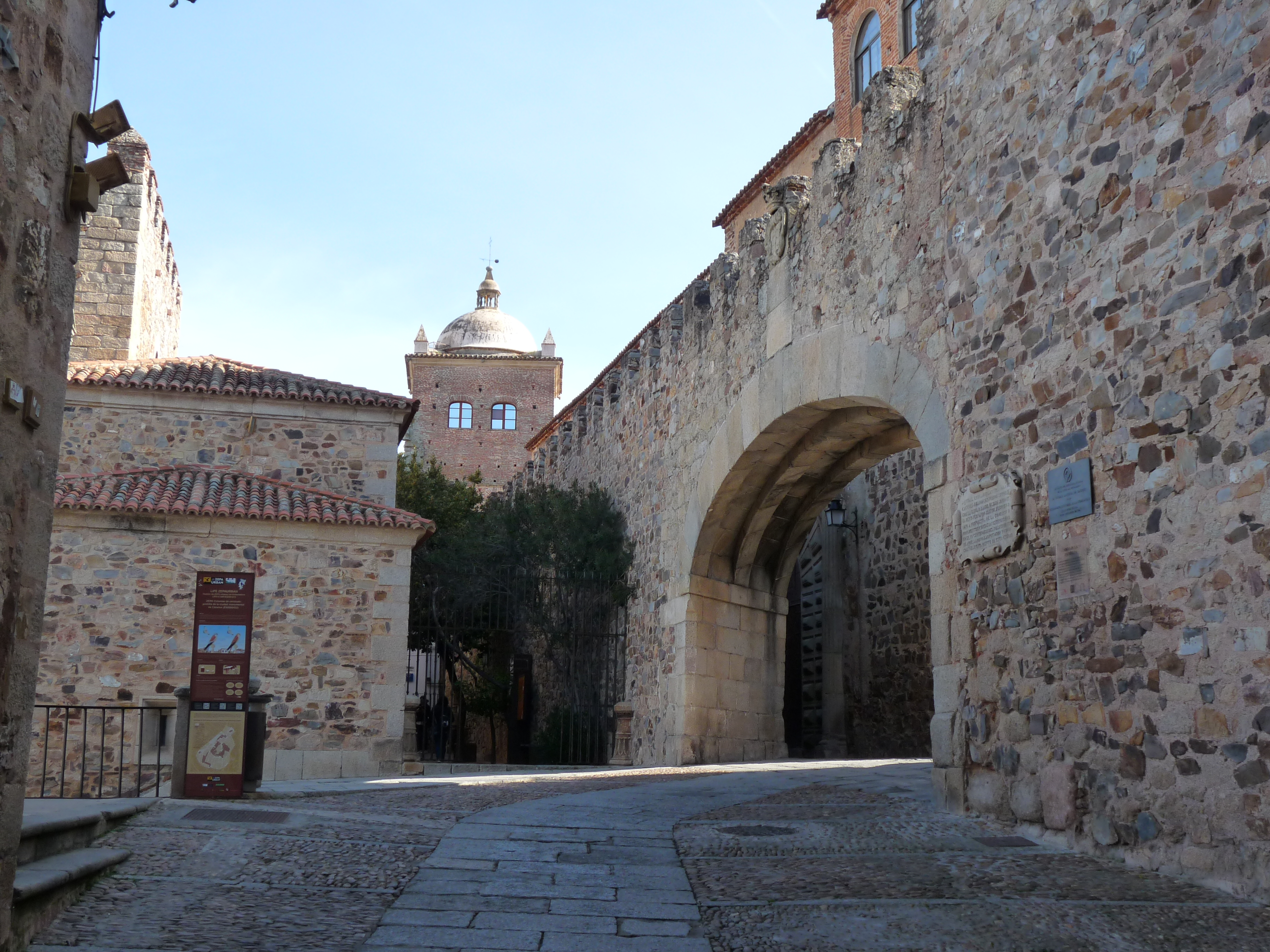
One of the arched entrances to the Monumental City

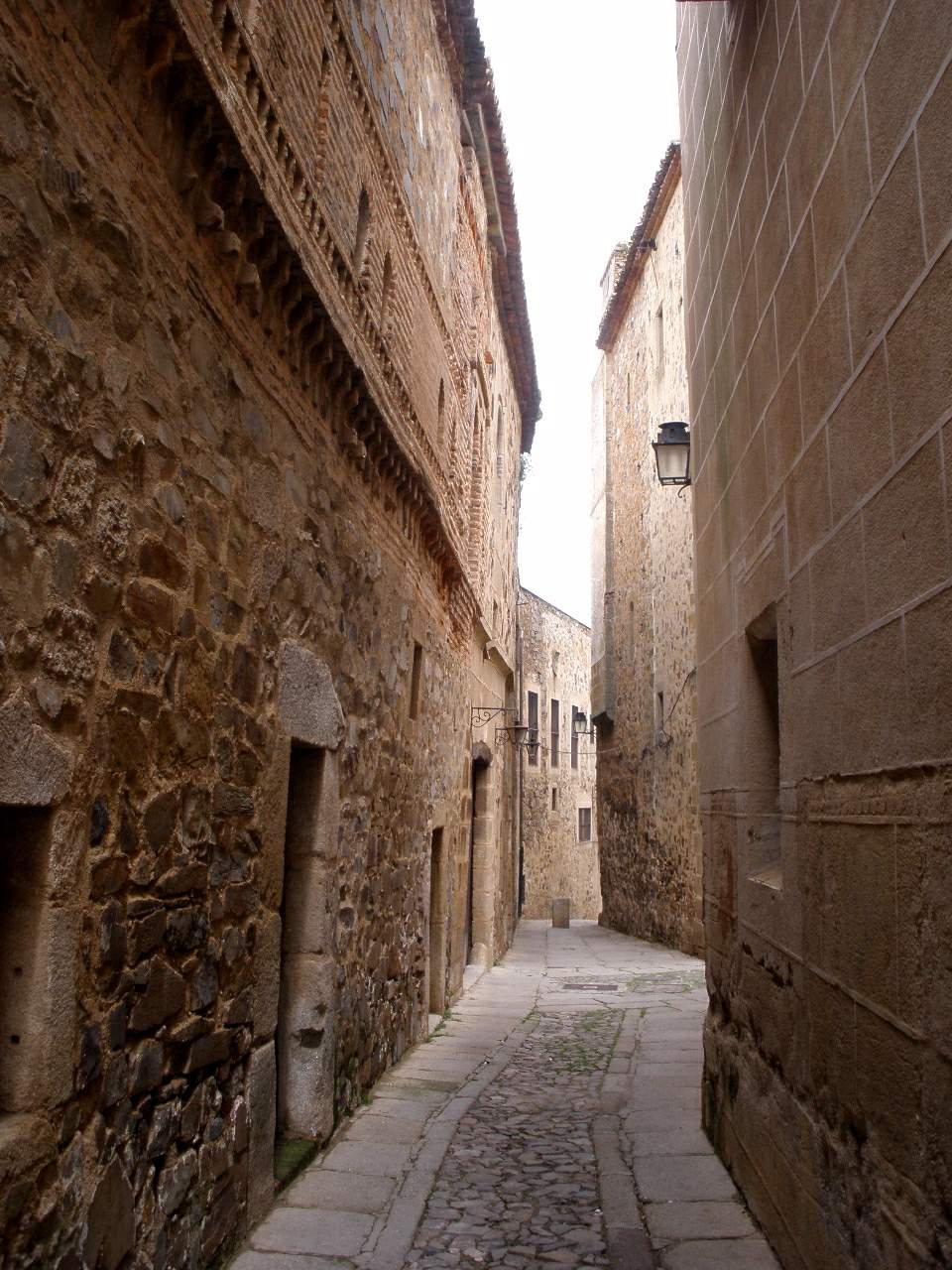
Calle Olmos, a typical narrow street in the Monumental City

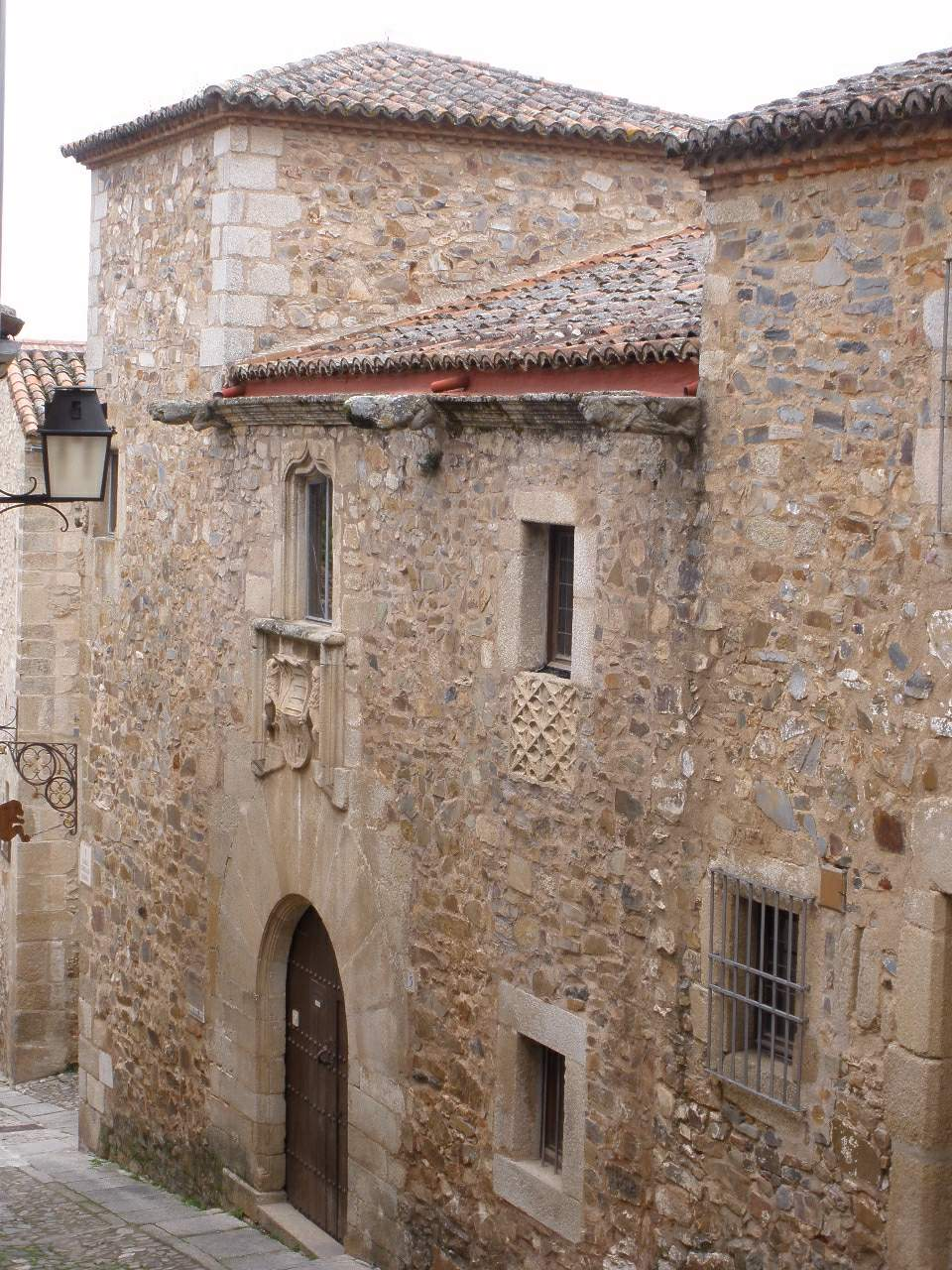
Casa del Mono

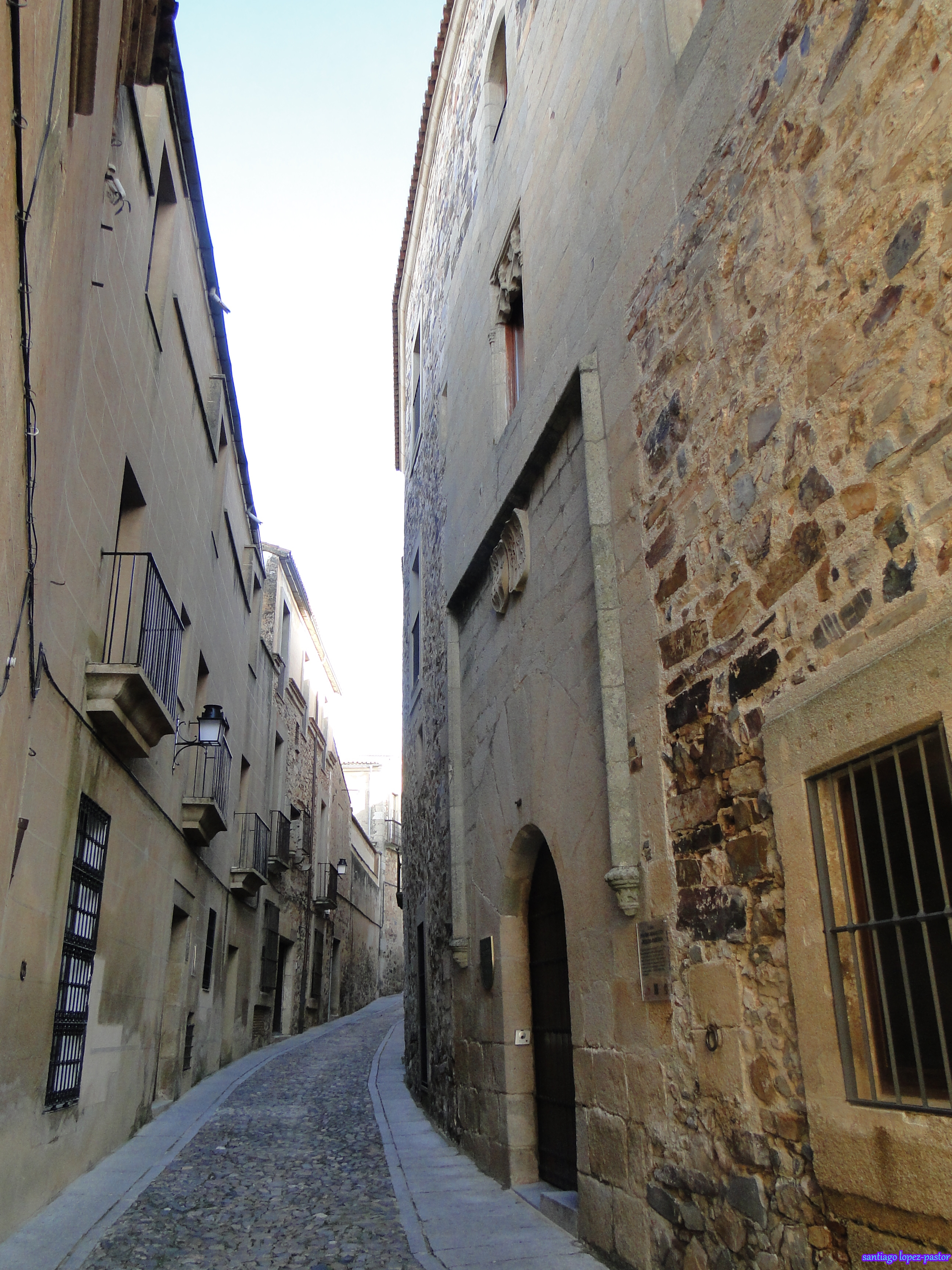
Casa de Ovando-Mogollón, Perero y Paredes

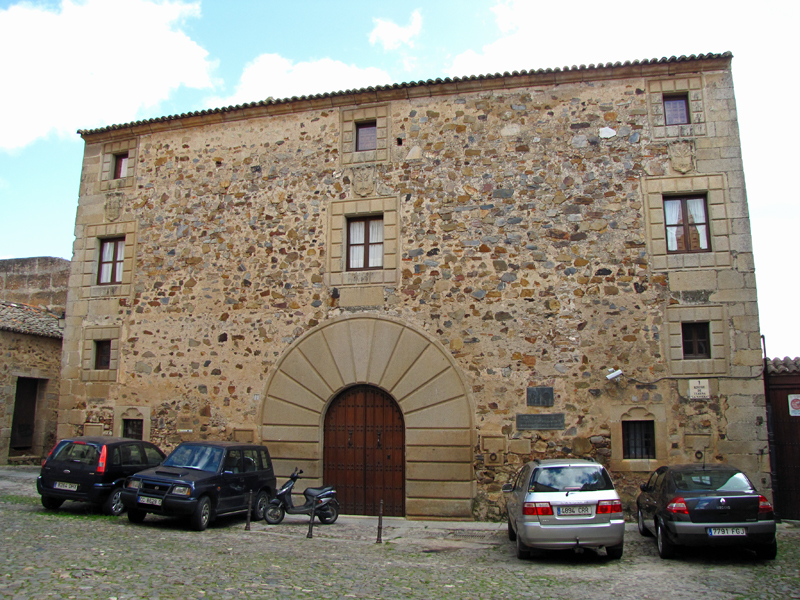
Casa de los Pereros

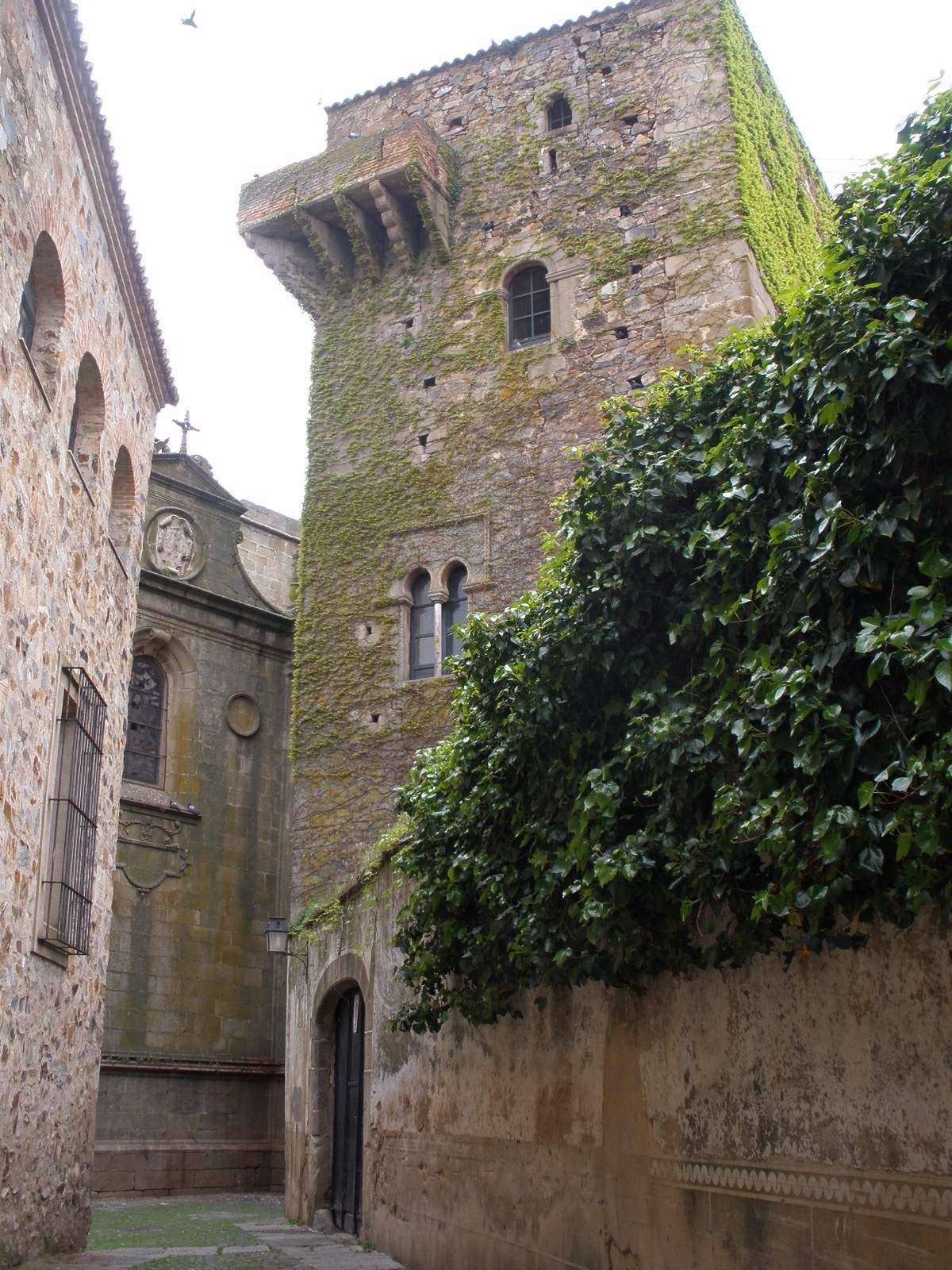
Palace of los Sande

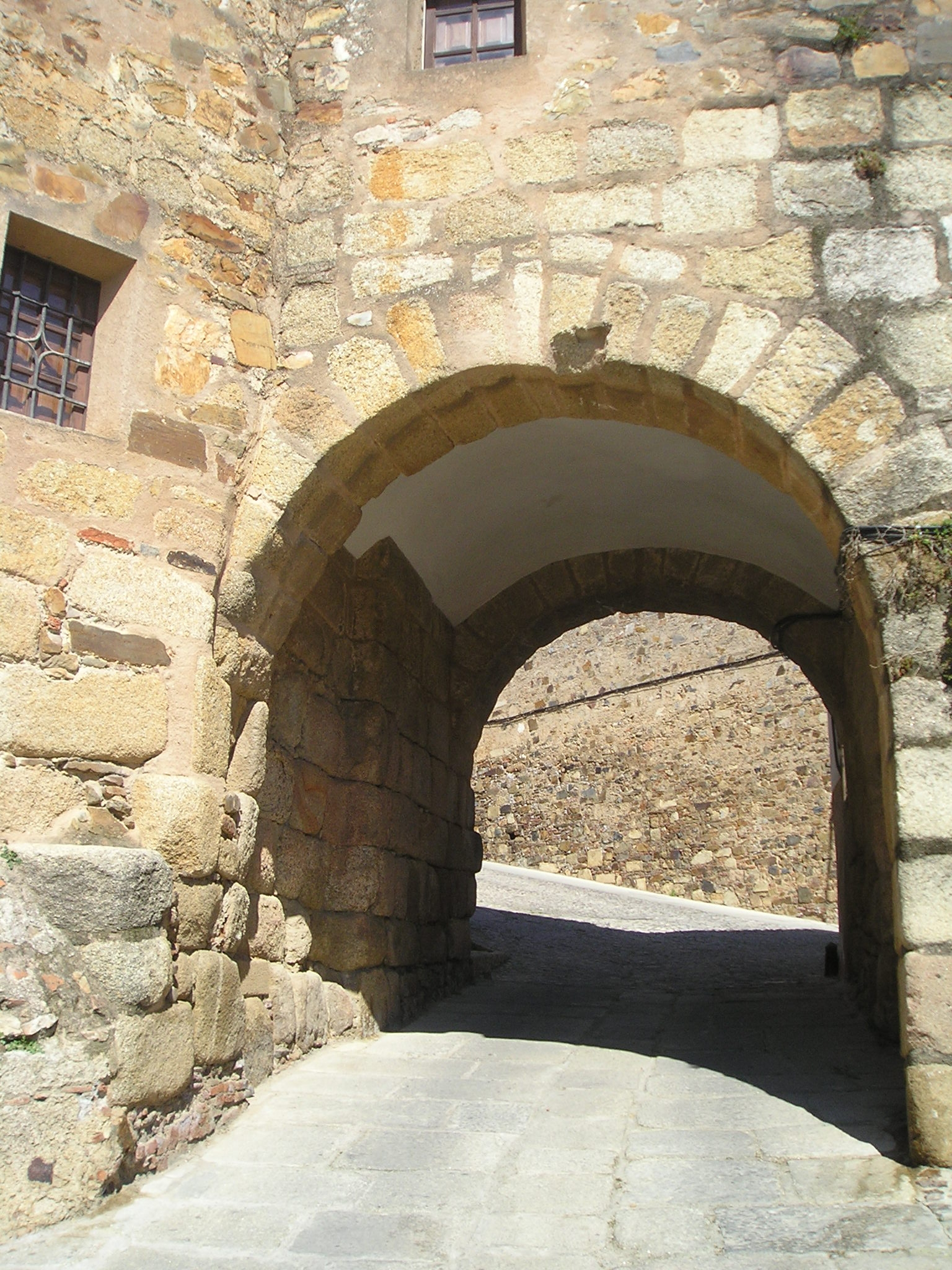
Arco de Cristo (Christ Arch) gate, in the monumental wall of Cáceres, is one of the few places on the wall where Roman construction elements remain.

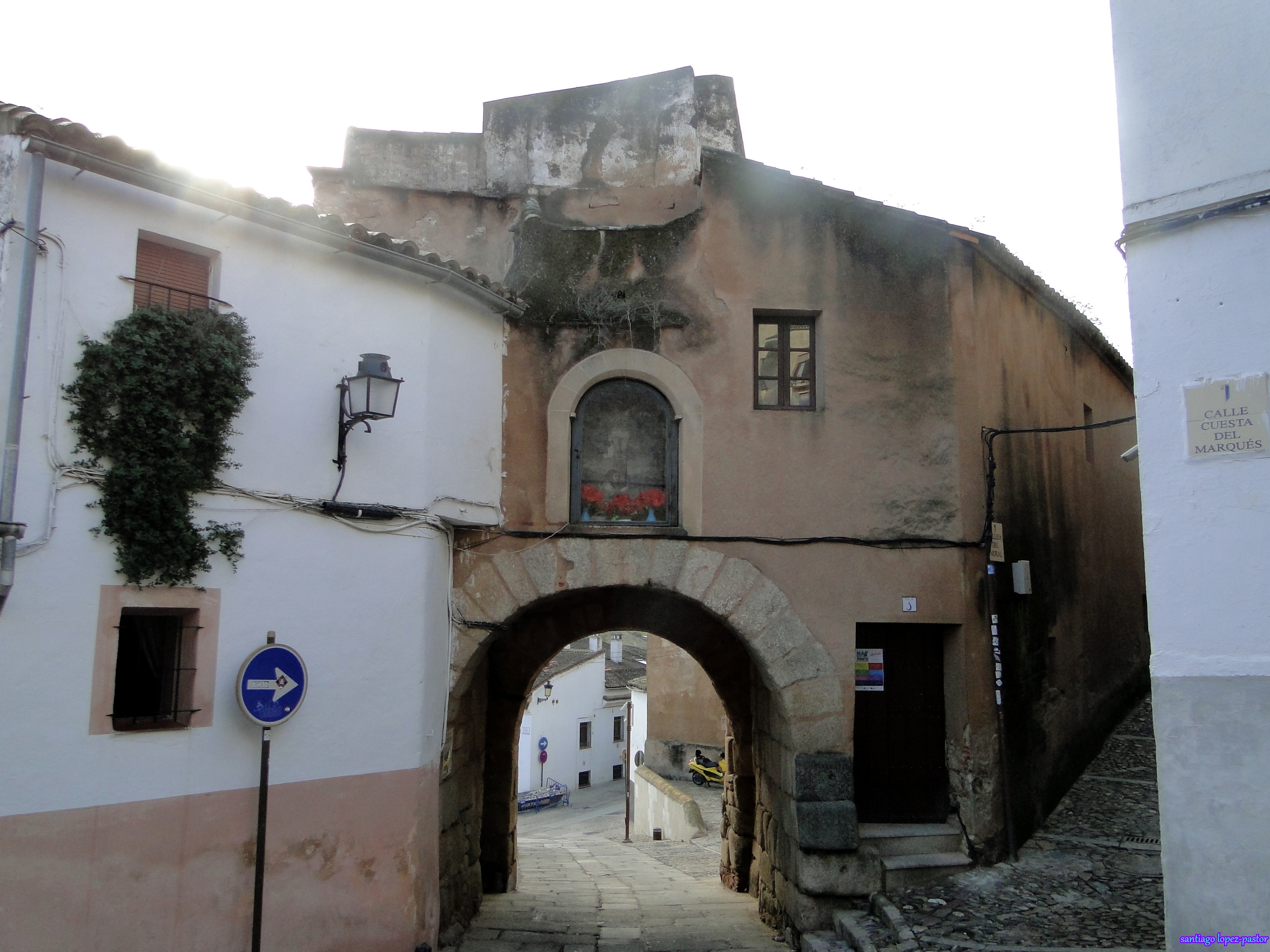
Another view of the Arco de Cristo from the other side.
