= Gente de razón =

Gente de razón (Spanish pronunciation: [ˈxente ðe raˈθon], "people of reason" or "rational people") is a Spanish term used in colonial Spanish America and modern Hispanic America to refer to people who were culturally Hispanicized. It was a social distinction that existed alongside racial categories. Indigenous peoples (indios or "Indians"), who maintained their culture and lived in their legally recognized communities (the repúblicas de indios), and mixed-race people (the castas), especially the poor in urban centers, were generally considered not to be gente de razón.

== Etymology ==
The term is ultimately derived from Aristotelian and Roman legal ideas about the use of reason in persons and the status of minority before the law. Under Roman law many adults (women, grown men who were not heads of household) were deemed legal minors under the protection of a tutor (usually the pater familias).

Additionally, in the early establishment of New Spain, indigenous peoples who converted and were baptized into the Catholic religion often adopted Christian first names and Spanish last names as signs of outward transformation. Colonial leaders used the term "gente de razón" ("people of reason") to distinguish these converted natives from unconverted ones.

== In Spanish America ==
Since the sixteenth century the Laws of the Indies categorized Indians as minors under the protection of the Crown (cf. Dhimmi status in the Ottoman legal system). Slaves were also legally deemed not to belong to the gente de razón. These groups were also excluded from the priesthood for most of the colonial period.

In frontier regions such as Chile, Río de la Plata or the Provincias Internas, the category of gente de razón gained additional importance and it was interpreted differently than in the areas with a longer Spanish presence. Since the term was used to distinguish between acculturated people who lived in Spanish settlements (the repúblicas de españoles) from the gente sin razón ("people without reason"), or Natives who had not accepted Spanish rule or who lived on missions, it often included acculturated people who normally might not have been included. These areas were settled by Hispanized Indians from the older areas of Spanish settlement, Mulattos, Blacks and Mestizos, all who usually became gente de razón. Because of this, in the frontier areas mixed-race people had a greater chance of social mobility, and their descendants often became the elites of the region.

== See also ==
- Detribalization
- Casta
- Emancipados
- Black Ladinos
- Ladino people
- Affranchis
- Creoles of color
- Évolués
- Principalía
- Ilustrado
- Assimilation (French colonialism)
- Hispanic eugenics
- Hispanidad
