= Assimilation (French colonialism) =

1800s–1900s French colonial policy principle

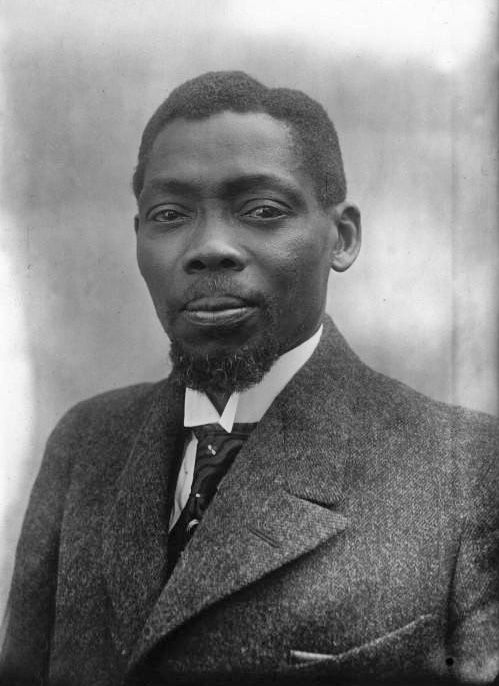
Blaise Diagne, an African politician in French West Africa and a major supporter of the "assimilation" concept.

Assimilation was a major ideological component of French colonialism. The concept of assimilation in French colonial discourse was based on the idea of spreading French culture to France's colonies in the 19th and the 20th centuries. Colonial subjects living in French colonies were considered French citizens as long as French culture and customs were adopted. That also meant that they would have the rights and duties of French citizens.

The meaning of assimilation has been greatly debated. One possible definition stated that French laws apply to all colonies outside France regardless of the distance from France, the size of the colony, the organization of society, the economic development, race or religious beliefs. A cultural definition for assimilation can be the expansion of the French culture outside Europe.

Arthur Girault published Principes de colonisation et de Legislation coloniale in 1885, which defined assimilation as "eclectic". Its ideal, he considered "the constantly more intimate union between the colonial territory and the metropolitan territory". He also wrote that all military responsibilities of a French citizen also apply to the natives of the colonies.

== History ==
The creation of modern France through expansion goes back to the establishment of a small kingdom in the area around Paris in the late 10th century and was not completed until the corporation of Nice and Savoy in 1860. The existing "hexagon" was the result of a long series of wars and conquests involving the triumph of the French language and the French culture over what once were autonomous and culturally distinctive communities, especially the Occitan-speaking areas of Southern France, whose language (langue d'oc), distinct from French, was banned from official use in the 16th century and from everyday use during the French Revolution. The creation of the French hexagon by conquest and annexations established an ideological precedent for the "civilising mission" that served as a rationale for French colonialism. A long experience of turning peasants and culturally-exogenous provincials into Frenchmen seemed to raise the possibility that the same could be done for the colonised peoples of Africa and Asia.

The initial stages of assimilation in France were observed during the revolution. In 1794, deputies, some of whom were from the Caribbean and from French India, passed a law that declared that "all men resident in the colonies, without distinction of color, are French citizens and enjoy all the rights assured by the Constitution".

In the early 19th century under Napoleon Bonaparte, new laws were created for the colonies to replace the previous universal laws that applied to both France and the colonies. Bonaparte rejected assimilation and declared that the colonies would be governed under separate laws. He believed that if universal laws continued, the residents of the colonies would eventually have the power to control the local governments, which would have an adverse effect on "cheap slave labour". He meanwhile reinstated slavery in the Caribbean possessions.

Even with Bonaparte's rejection of assimilation, many still believed it to be a good practice. On July 24, 1833, a law was passed to give all free colony residents "civil and political rights". Also, the Revolution in 1848 restored "assimilation theory", with colonies again under universal rules.

There were many problems that emerged during colonisation, but those faced with the dilemmas thought assimilation sounded simple and attainable and wanted to spread French culture. Claude Adrien Helvétius, a philosopher and supporter of assimilation, believed that education was essential to assimilation.

== French political opposition to assimilation ==
Voices were raised during the Third Republic against the very principle of colonial assimilation. Some political figures believed that attempting to impose French cultural norms on non-European societies amounted to a rigid and unrealistic form of universalism. Georges Leygues, Minister of the Colonies and later Minister of the Interior, of the Navy, and President of the council, declared in 1920 before the Assembly that a policy of crushing uniformity should be avoided, and rejected the policy of assimilation, especially when dealing with peoples possessing ancient traditions and civilizations:

“[...] when faced with Muslim, Hindu, Annamite populations, all with a long history of brilliant civilizations, the policy of assimilation would be the most disastrous and absurd. (Applause.) Why force all minds into the same mold? With these peoples, we must pursue a policy of association and cooperation, respecting all their traditions and all the religions of the diverse peoples with whom we are engaged. (Applause from the right.)”

== Protests against assimilation ==
Colonial subjects in West Africa devised a variety of strategies to resist the establishment of a colonial system and to oppose specific institutions of the system such as labourers engaged in strike action in the late 19th and the early 20th centuries in Lagos, the Cameroons, Dahomey, and Guinea.

Ideological protests included the banding together of the Lobi and the Bambara of French Sudan against the spread of French culture. Shaykh Ahmadu Bamba founded a movement, Mouridiyya, to protest the establishment of French colonial rule, while numerous messianic or millenarian or Ethiopian churches with distinctively African liturgies and doctrines were established to resist the imposition of Western-style Christianity.

Meanwhile, a variety of groups formed to protest specific colonialist laws or measures imposed on indigenous populations, such as the Young Senegalese Club and the Aborigines' Rights Protection Society, which used newspapers, pamphlets, and plays to protect themselves from assimilation.

Despite widespread protests, colonialism was firmly entrenched in the whole of West Africa by World War I. Until the abolishing of the colonial rule, Africa had endured many oppressions in relation to religion, tradition, customs and culture.

== Senegal's Four Communes ==
Examples of assimilation in practice in the colonies were in Senegal's Four Communes: Gorée, Dakar, Rufisque and Saint-Louis. The purpose of the theory of assimilation was to turn African natives into Frenchmen by educating them in the language and culture and making them equal French citizens. During the French Revolution of 1848, slavery was abolished, and the Four Communes were given voting rights and granted the right to elect a Deputy to the National Assembly in Paris. In the 1880s, France expanded its rule to other colonies. There was opposition from the French locals and so the universal laws did not apply to the new colonies.

The residents of the Four Communes were referred as "originaires" and had been exposed to assimilation for so long that they had become a "typical French citizen... he was expected to be everything except in the color of his skin, a Frenchman." They were African elite". One of them was Blaise Diagne, who was the first black deputy in the French National assembly. He "defended the status of the originaires as French citizens". During his time as deputy, he proposed a resolution that would allow the residents of the Four Communes all the rights of French citizens, which included being able to serve in the army. That was especially important during World War I, and the resolution passed on October 19, 1915.

== See also ==
- Francization
- Évolués
- Affranchis
- Assimilados
- Ilustrados
- Emancipados
- Black Ladinos
- Chinese
