= Ilustrado =

Member of the Filipino educated class during the Spanish colonial period

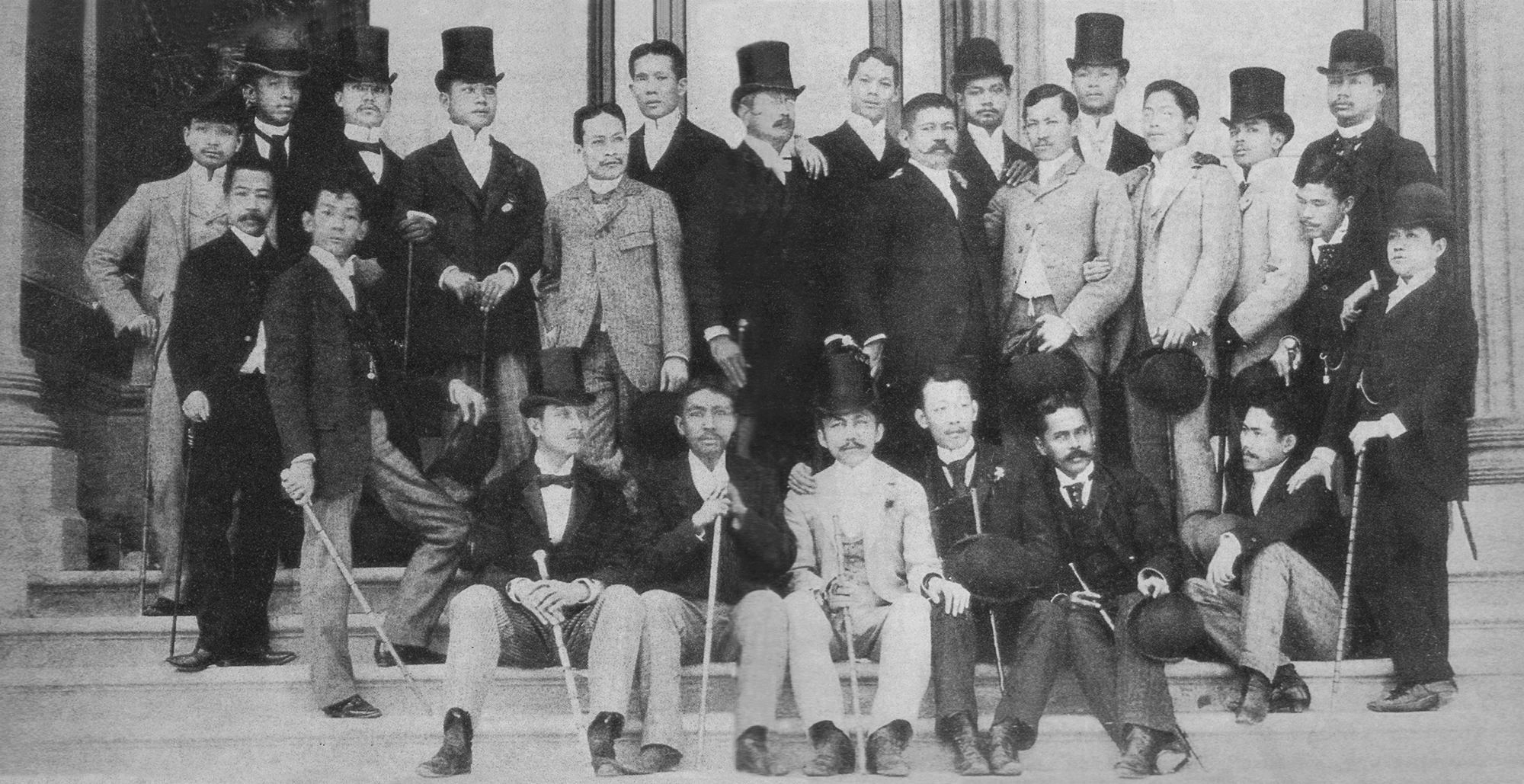
Ilustrados in Madrid, c.1890; Standing clockwise from left: Vicente Francisco, Cajigas, José Abreu, Mariano Abella, Dominador Gómez, Francisco Tongio Liongson, Flaviano Cordecruz, a Tuazon from Malabon, Alejandro Yance de Lara, Lauro Dimayuga, Marcelo H. del Pilar, Gregorio Aguilera, José Rizal, José Alejandrino, Baldomero Roxas, Moises Salvador, Modesto Reyes, Gaudencio Juanengo, Pablo Rianzares Bautista; Seated from left: Dr. Santamaria, Candido Morada, Damaso Ponce, Ariston Bautista, Pedro Serrano Lactao, and Teodoro Sandiko

The Ilustrados (Spanish: [ilusˈtɾaðos], "erudite", "learned" or "enlightened ones") constituted the Filipino intelligentsia (educated class) during the Spanish colonial period in the late 19th century. Elsewhere in New Spain (of which the Philippines were part), the term gente de razón carried a similar meaning.

They were late Spanish-colonial-era middle to upper class Filipinos, many of whom were educated in Spain and exposed to Spanish liberal and European nationalist ideals. The ilustrado class was composed of Philippine-born and/or raised intellectuals and cut across ethnolinguistic and racial lines—mestizos (both de Sangleyes and de Español), insulares, and indios, among others—and sought reform through "a more equitable arrangement of both political and economic power" under Spanish tutelage.

Stanley Karnow, in his In Our Image: America's Empire in the Philippines, referred to the ilustrados as the "rich Intelligentsia" because many were the children of wealthy landowners or inquilino (tenant) lessee families. They were key figures in the development of Filipino nationalism.

== History ==
The most prominent ilustrados were Graciano López Jaena, Marcelo H. del Pilar, Mariano Ponce, Antonio Luna and José Rizal, the Philippine national hero. Rizal's novels Noli Me Tangere ("Touch Me Not") and El Filibusterismo ("The Subversive") "exposed to the world the injustices imposed on Filipinos under the Spanish colonial regime".

In the beginning, Rizal and his fellow ilustrados preferred not to win independence from Spain, instead they wanted legal equality for both peninsulares and natives—indios, insulares, and mestizos, among others—in the economic reforms demanded by the ilustrados were that "the Philippines be represented in the Cortes and be considered a province of Spain" and "the secularization of the parishes."

However, in 1872, nationalist sentiment grew strongest, when three Filipino priests, José Burgos, Mariano Gomez and friar Jacinto Zamora, who had been charged with leading a military mutiny at an arsenal in Cavite, near Manila, were executed by the Spanish authorities. The event and "other repressive acts and activities, Rizal was executed on December 30, 1896. His execution propelled the ilustrados. This also prompted unity among the ilustrados and Andrés Bonifacio's radical Katipunan. Philippine policies by the United States reinforced the dominant position of the ilustrados within Filipino society. Friar estates were sold to the ilustrados and most government positions were offered to them.

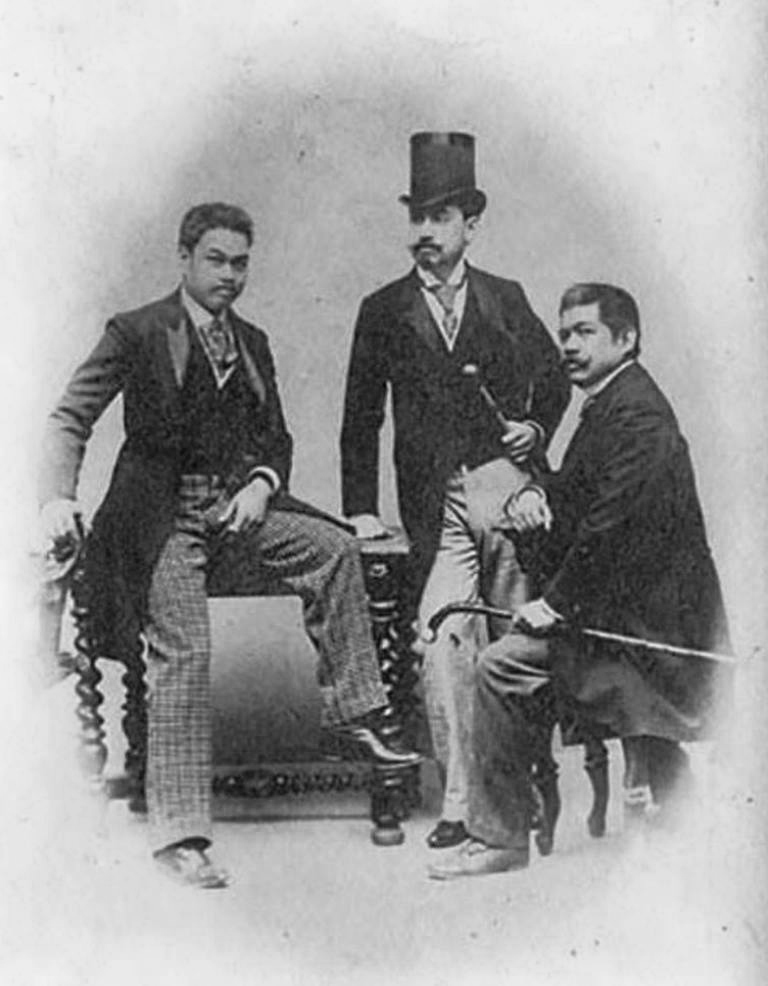
Ilocano Antonio Luna, Insular Criollo Eduardo de Lete (center) and Tagalog Marcelo H. del Pilar (seated, right), in Spain, 1890

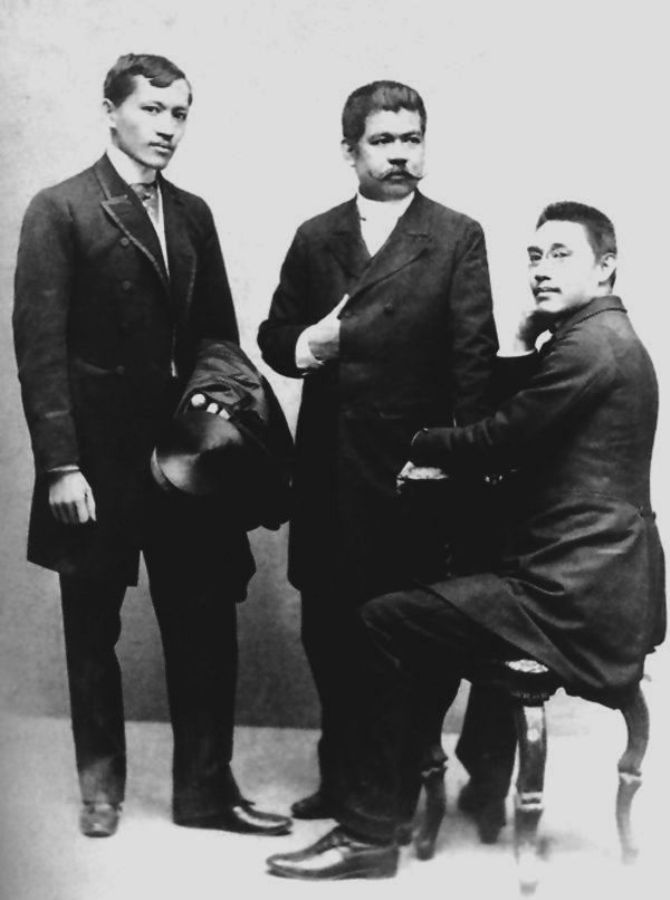
Three prominent ilustrados in Spain: Dr. José Rizal, Marcelo H. del Pilar and Mariano Ponce (from left to right). Photo was taken in Spain in 1890.

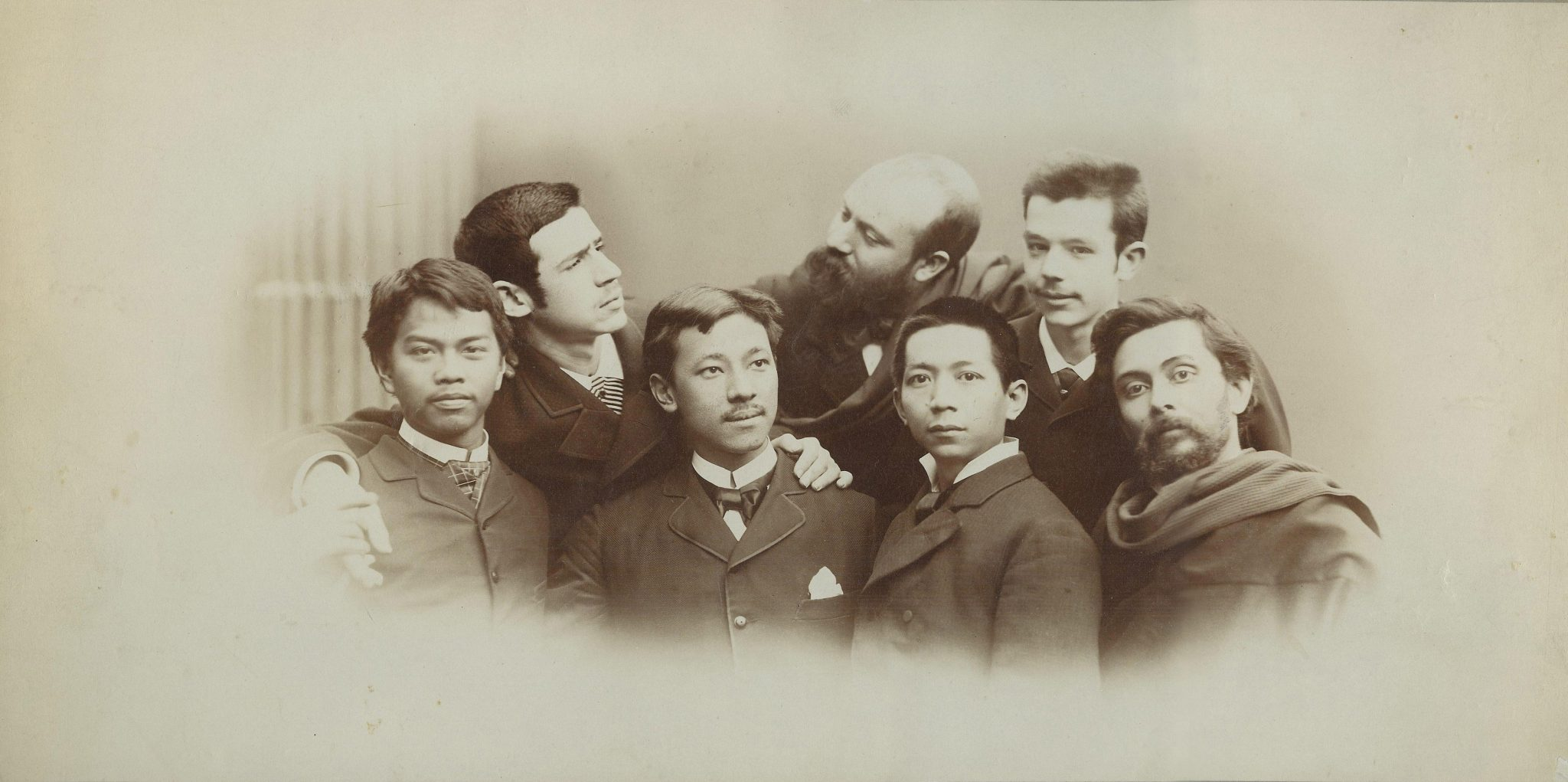
The four Filipino Ilustrados in front of the three peninsula Spaniard artists are; (left to right) Juan Luna, Pedro Paterno, Félix Hidalgo and Miguel Zaragoza

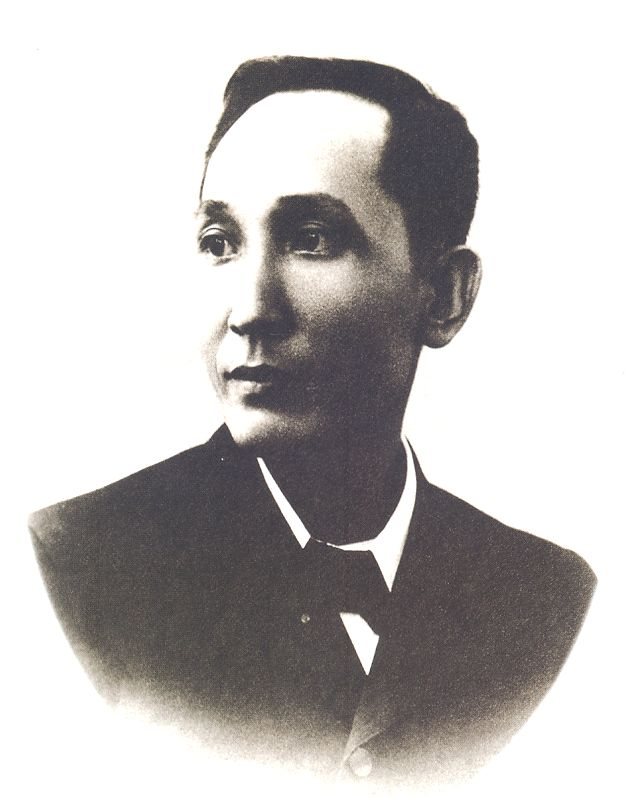
Apolinario Mabini

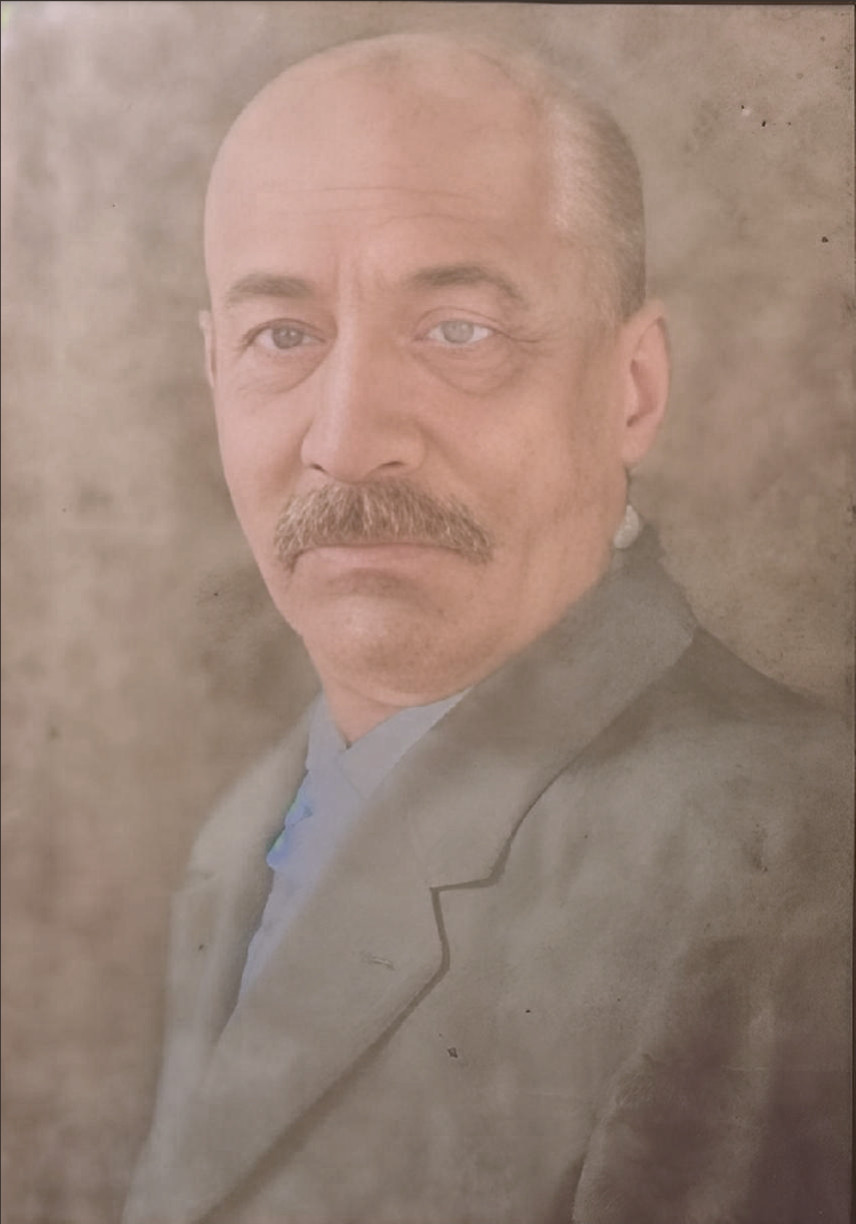
Julio A. Llorente, a Spanish-Cebuano Mestizo - Ilustrado who would become the first Philippine governor of Cebu and Samar.

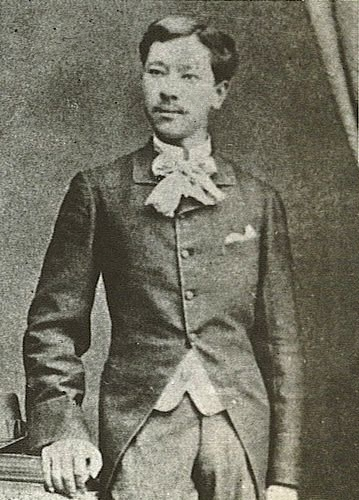
Sangley-Tagalog mestizo from Manila - Pedro Paterno, poet and a novelist who would become the Prime Minister of the First Philippine Republic.

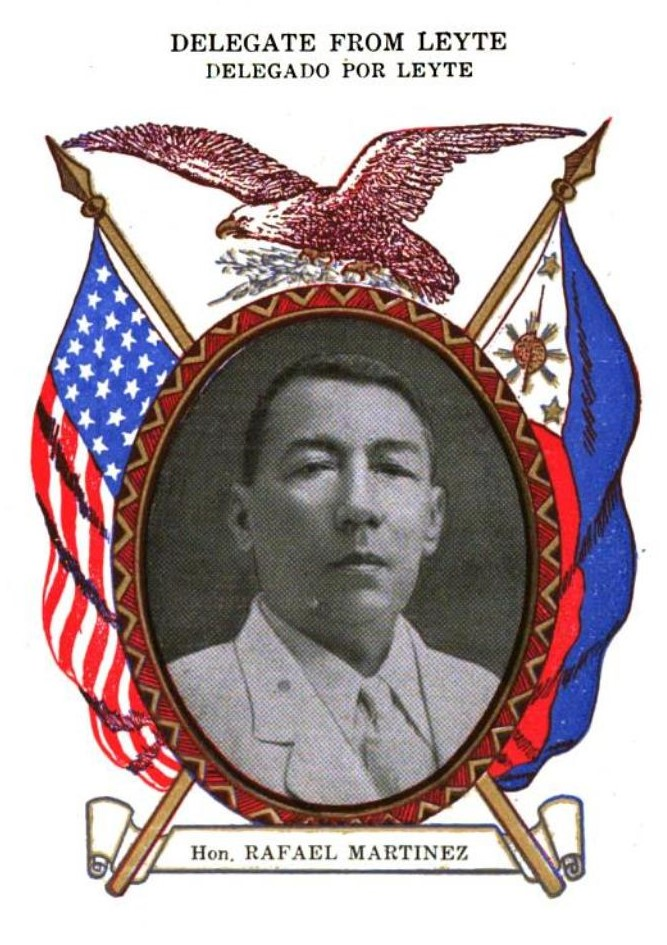
Rafael Martinez of Bohol.

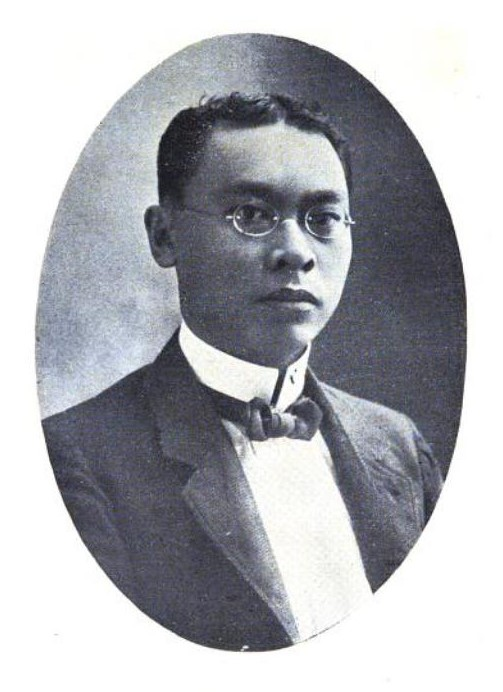
Jaime de Veyra

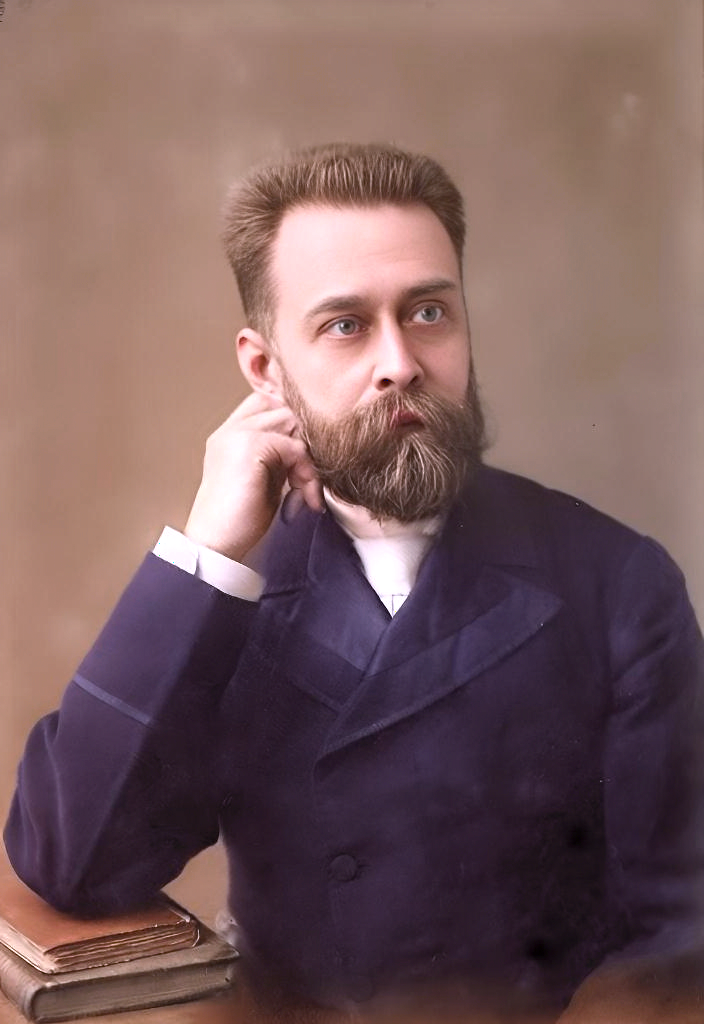
Jacobo Zóbel pharmacist and businessman.

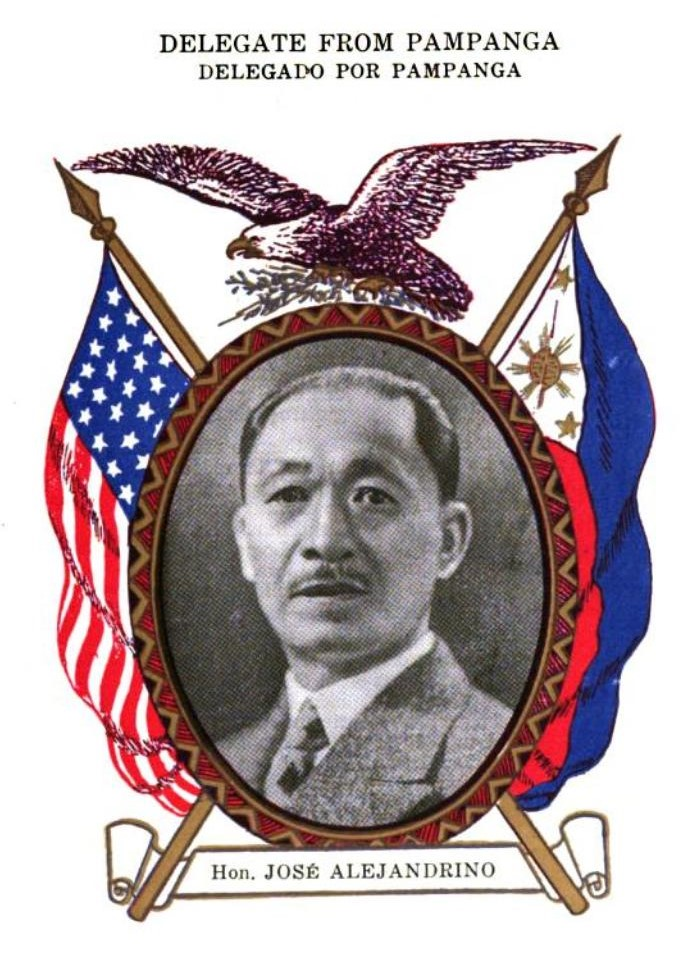
José Alejandrino of Pampanga.

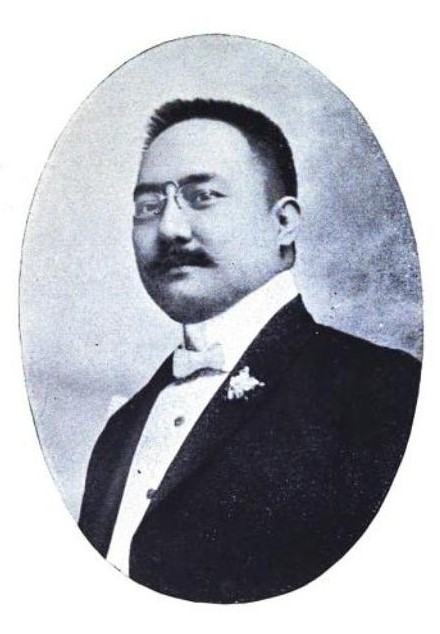
Dominador Gómez

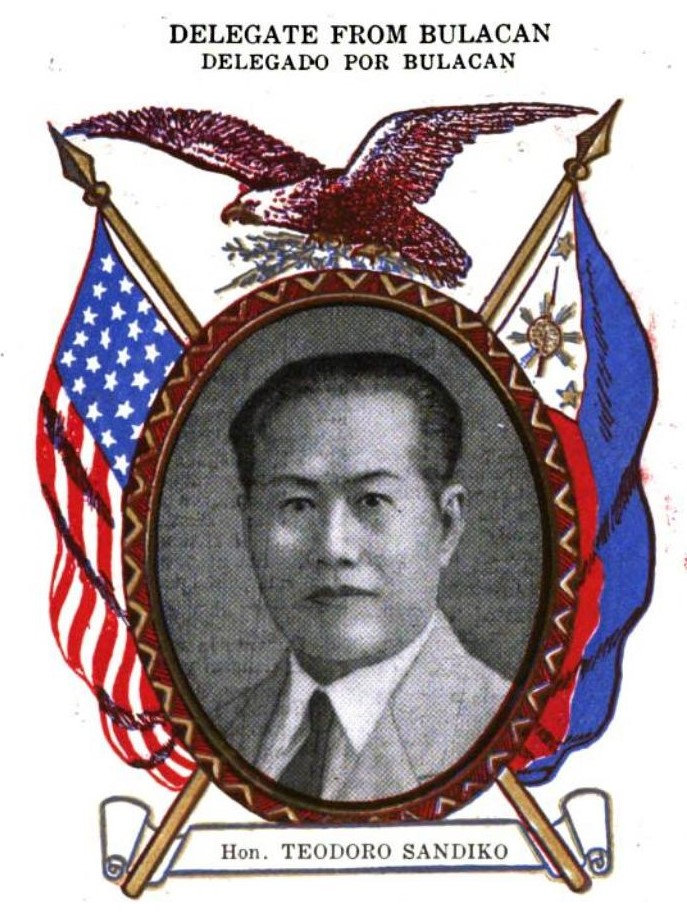
Teodoro Sandiko of Bulacan.

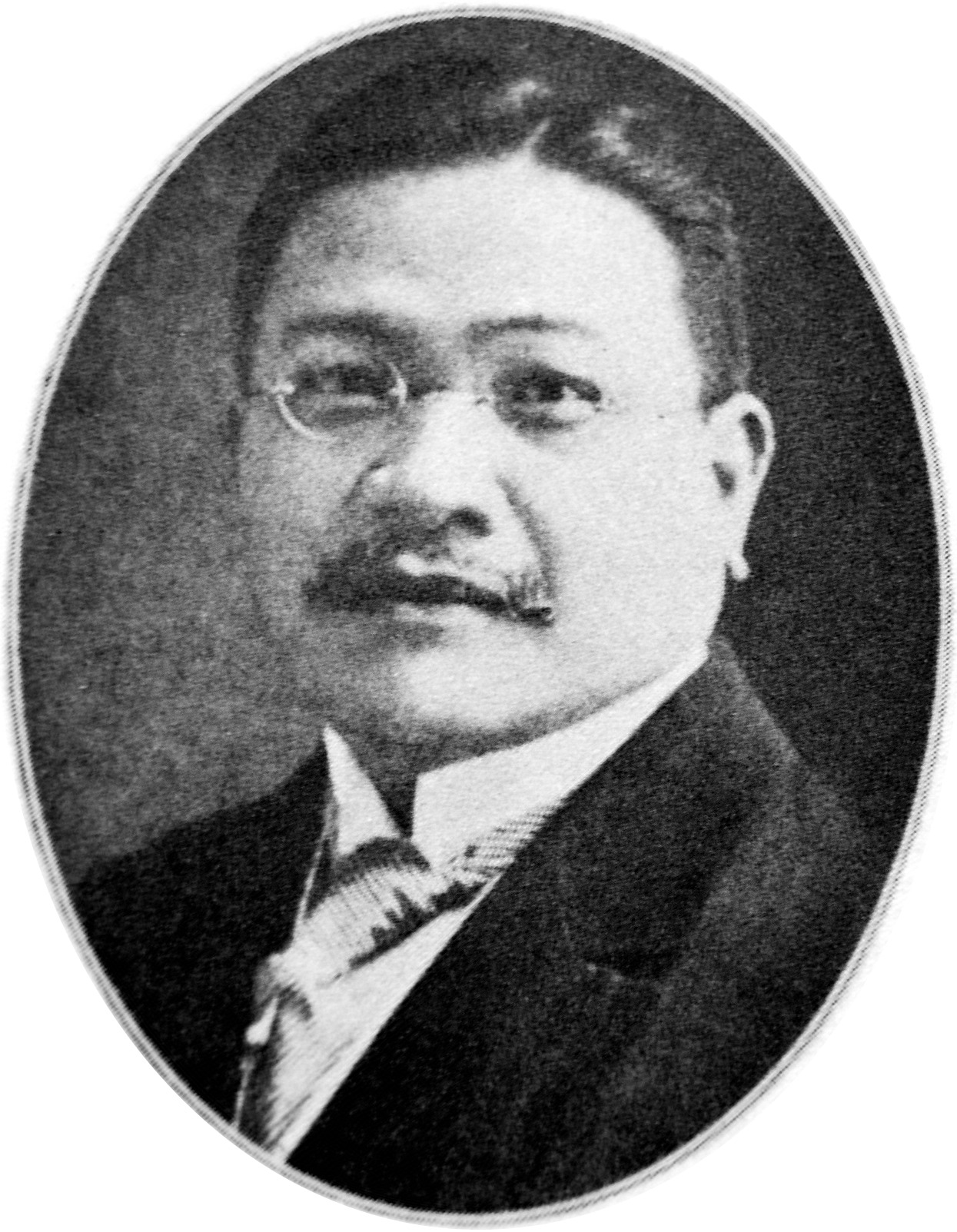
Francisco Tongio Liongson

== See also ==
- Principalía
- Filipino nationalism
- Philippine literature in Spanish
- Spanish language in the Philippines
- Filipino Mestizos
- Spanish Filipino
- Mestizos de Sangley (Chinese Mestizos)
- Assimilados
- Ladino people
  - Black Ladino
- Évolués
- Affranchis
- Emancipados
- Gente de razón
