= Spanish America =

15th–19th century territory in the Americas

The Indies (the Spanish American mainland, the Antilles and the Philippines) Reinos de las Indias
- 1492–1810; 1814–1826
- Flag Coat of arms

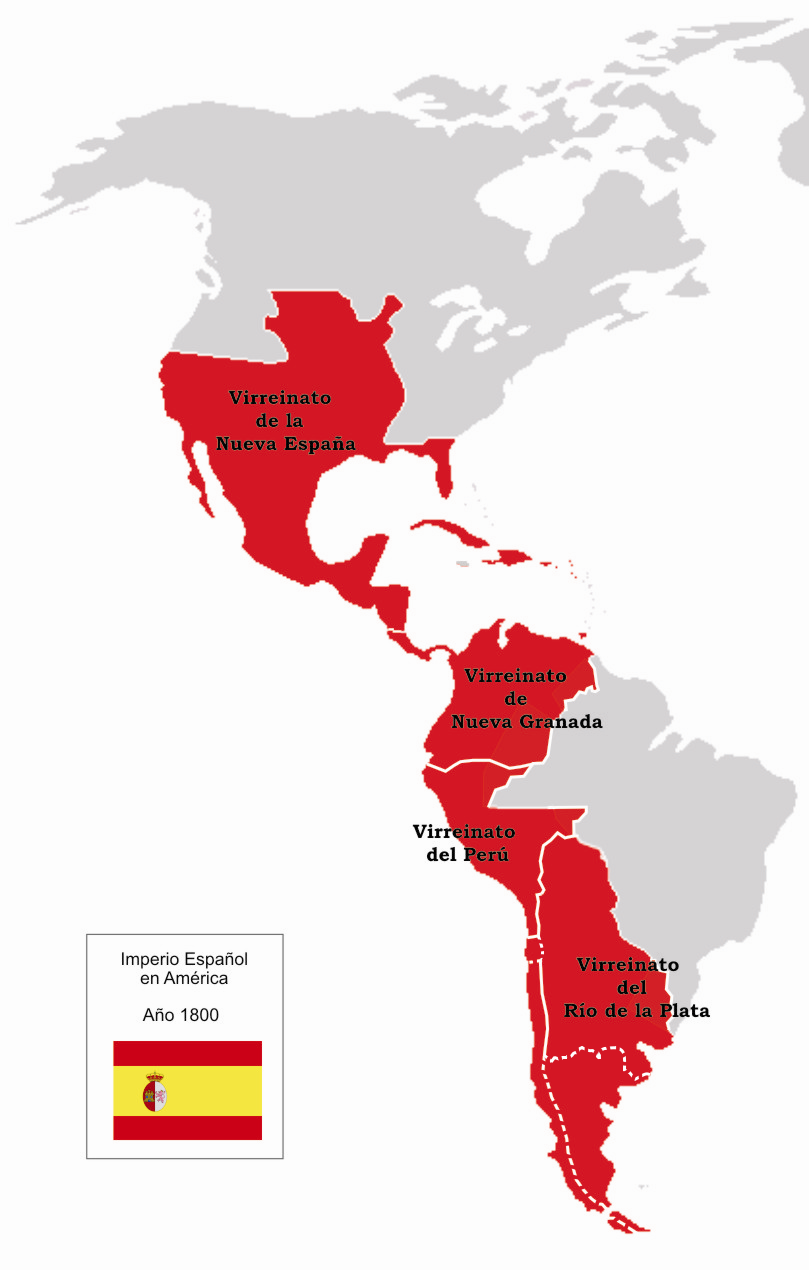
- The Indies in the Americas, circa 1800 with four viceroyalties: New Spain, New Granada, Peru and La Plata
- Status: Dependencies of the Crown of Castile and the Spanish Monarchy
- Capital: Mexico City (1535–1821); Lima (1542–1824); Santa Fe (1717–1723, 1739–1810, 1816–1819); Buenos Aires (1776–1810)
- Common languages: Castilian
- Government: Monarchy
- Monarch
  - 1492–1504: Isabella I
  - 1808–1833: Ferdinand VII
- Legislature: Council of the Indies
- History
  - Discovery of the Americas: 1492
  - Alexandrine Bulls: 1493
  - Creation of the Council of the Indies: 1524
  - New Laws: 1542
  - Bourbon Reforms: 1750–1808
  - Napoleonic Spain: 1808
  - Spanish liberalism: 1810
- Currency: Spanish real, maravedí
Preceded by
Aztec Empire
Inca Empire
Muisca Confederation
Chiefdoms of Hispaniola
Purépecha Empire
Kʼicheʼ kingdom of Qʼumarkaj
Peten Itza kingdom
Succeeded by
Gran Colombia
United Provinces of the Río de la Plata
First Mexican Empire
Protectorate of San Martín
New Fatherland
Bolivia
Reign of Ferdinand VII of Spain

The Spanish Empire (yellow) in 1800

Spanish America refers to the Spanish territories in the Americas, part of the Spanish overseas territories historically known as "the Indies" (Sp. las Indias), during the period of Spanish colonization of the Americas. The term "the Indies" was specifically used during the territories' imperial era between 15th and 19th centuries. To the end of its imperial rule, Spain called its territories in the Antilles and the Philippines "overseas possessions" until the end of its imperial rule in 1898, an enduring remnant of Columbus's notion that he had reached Asia by sailing west. When these territories reached a high level of importance, the crown established the Council of the Indies in 1524, following the conquest of the Aztec Empire, asserting permanent royal control over its possessions. Regions with dense indigenous populations and sources of mineral wealth attracting Spanish settlers became colonial centers, while those without such resources were peripheral to crown interest. Once regions were incorporated into the empire and their importance assessed, overseas possessions came under stronger or weaker crown control.

The crown learned its lesson with the rule of Christopher Columbus and his heirs in the Caribbean, and they never subsequently gave authorization of sweeping powers to explorers and conquerors. The Catholic Monarchs' conquest of Granada in 1492 and their expulsion of the Jews "were militant expressions of religious statehood at the moment of the beginning of the American colonization." The crown's power in the religious sphere was absolute in its overseas possessions through the papacy's grant of the Patronato real, and "Catholicism was indissolubly linked with royal authority." Church-State relations were established in the conquest era and remained stable until the end of the Habsburg era in 1700, when the Bourbon monarchs implemented major reforms and changed the relationship between crown and altar.

The crown's administration of its overseas empire was implemented by royal officials in both the civil and religious spheres, often with overlapping jurisdictions. The crown could administer the empire in the Indies by using native elites as intermediaries with the large indigenous populations. Administrative costs of empire were kept low, with a small number of Spanish officials generally paid low salaries. Crown policy to maintain a closed commercial system limited to one port in Spain and only a few in the Indies was in practice not closed, with European merchant houses supplying Spanish merchants in the Spanish port of Seville with high quality textiles and other manufactured goods that Spain itself could not supply. Much of the silver of the Indies was diverted into those European merchant houses. Crown officials in the Indies enabled the creation of a whole commercial system in which they could coerce native populations to participate while reaping profits themselves in cooperation with merchants.

== History ==
=== 16th century ===
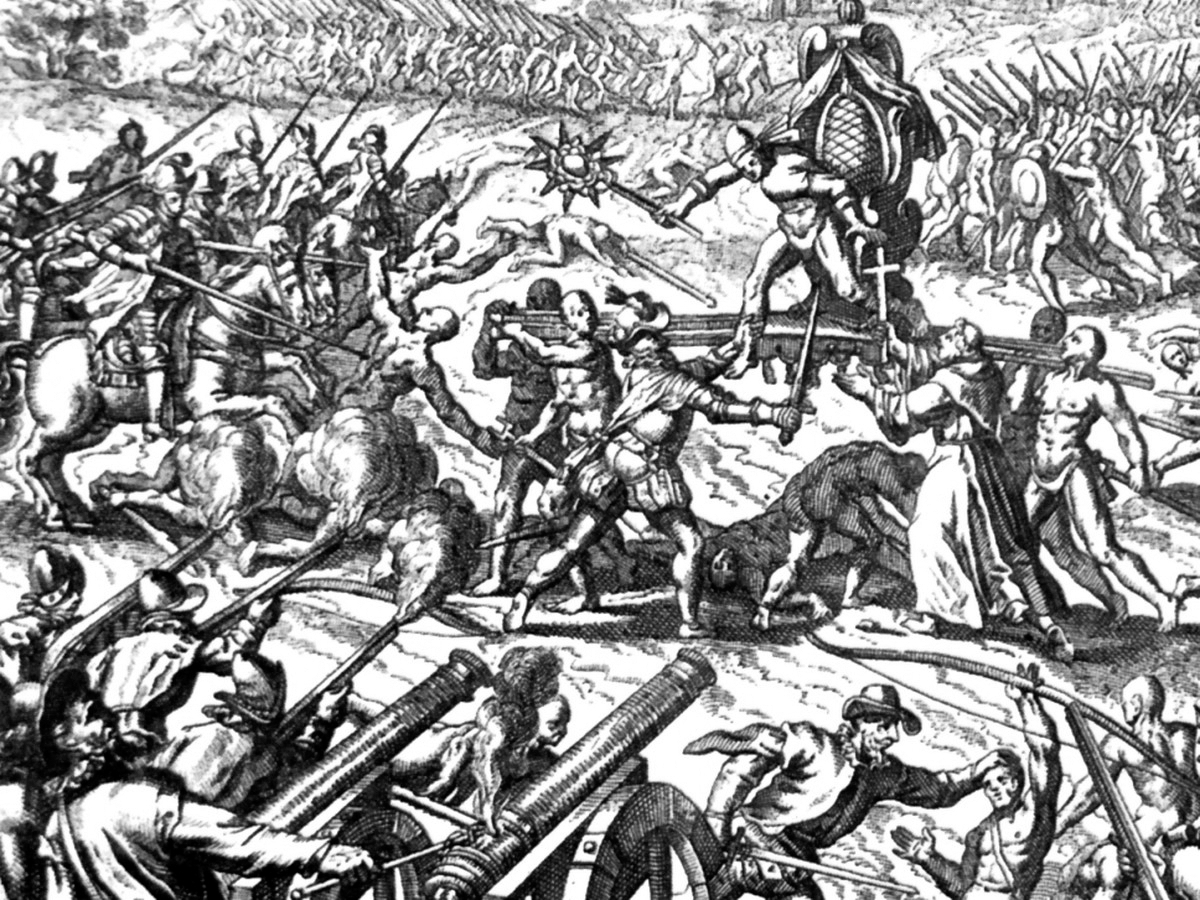
Inca emperor Atahualpa is shown surrounded on his palanquin at the Battle of Cajamarca.

The Spanish conquest was facilitated by the spread of diseases such as smallpox, common in Europe but never present in the New World, which reduced the indigenous populations in the Americas. This sometimes caused a labor shortage for plantations and public works and so the colonists informally and gradually, at first, initiated the Atlantic slave trade.

One of the most accomplished conquistadors was Hernán Cortés, who, leading a relatively small Spanish force but with local translators and the crucial support of thousands of native allies, achieved the Spanish conquest of the Aztec Empire in the campaigns of 1519–1521. This territory later became the Viceroyalty of New Spain, present day Mexico. Of equal importance was the Spanish conquest of the Inca Empire by Francisco Pizarro, which would become the Viceroyalty of Peru. The Spanish conquest of the Maya began in 1524, but the Maya kingdoms resisted integration into the Spanish Empire with such tenacity that their defeat took almost two centuries.

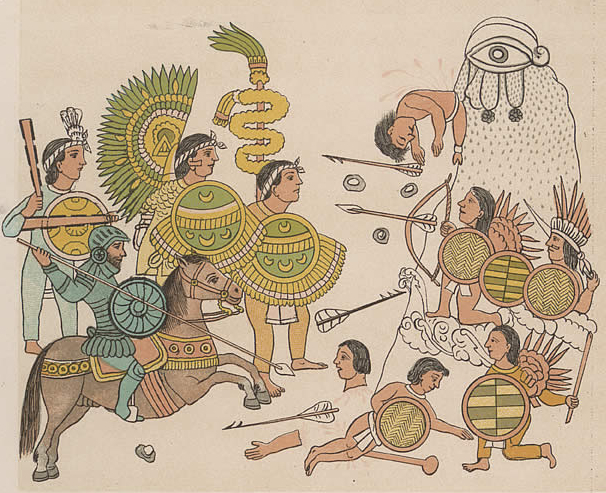
Cristóbal de Olid leads Spanish soldiers with Tlaxcalan allies in the conquests of Jalisco, 1522. From Lienzo de Tlaxcala.

After the conquest of Mexico, rumors of golden cities (Quivira and Cíbola in North America and El Dorado in South America) motivated several other expeditions. Many of those returned without having found their goal, or finding it much less valuable than was hoped. Indeed, the New World colonies only began to yield a substantial part of the Crown's revenues with the establishment of mines such as that of Potosí (Bolivia) and Zacatecas (Mexico) both started in 1546. By the late 16th century, silver from the Americas accounted for one-fifth of Spain's total budget.

Spanish empire in North America. Includes historical presence, claimed territories, points of interest and expeditions

Eventually the world's stock of precious metal was doubled or even tripled by silver from the Americas. Official records indicate that at least 75% of the silver was taken across the Atlantic to Spain and no more than 25% across the Pacific to China. Some modern researchers argue that due to rampant smuggling about 50% went to China. In the 16th century "perhaps 240,000 Europeans" entered American ports.

Further Spanish settlements were progressively established in the New World: New Granada in the 1530s (later in the Viceroyalty of New Granada in 1717 and present day Colombia), Lima in 1535 as the capital of the Viceroyalty of Peru, Buenos Aires in 1536 (later in the Viceroyalty of the Río de la Plata in 1776), and Santiago in 1541.

Florida was colonized in 1565 by Pedro Menéndez de Avilés when he founded St. Augustine and then promptly destroyed Fort Caroline in French Florida and massacred its several hundred Huguenot inhabitants after they surrendered. Saint Augustine quickly became a strategic defensive base for the Spanish ships full of gold and silver being sent to Spain from its New World dominions.

Spanish explorations and routes across the Pacific Ocean.

The Portuguese mariner sailing for Castile, Ferdinand Magellan, died while in the Philippines commanding a Castilian expedition in 1522, which was the first to circumnavigate the globe. The Basque commander Juan Sebastián Elcano led the expedition to success. Spain sought to enforce their rights in the Moluccan islands, which led a conflict with the Portuguese, but the issue was resolved with the Treaty of Zaragoza (1525), settling the location of the antimeridian of Tordesillas, which would divide the world into two equal hemispheres. From then on, maritime expeditions led to the discovery of several archipelagos in the South Pacific as the Pitcairn Islands, the Marquesas, Tuvalu, Vanuatu, the Solomon Islands or New Guinea, to which Spain laid claim.

Most important in Pacific exploration was the claim on the Philippines, which was populous and strategically located for the Spanish settlement of Manila and entrepôt for trade with China. On 27 April 1565, the first permanent Spanish settlement in the Philippines was founded by Miguel López de Legazpi and the service of Manila Galleons was inaugurated. The Manila Galleons shipped goods from all over Asia across the Pacific to Acapulco on the coast of Mexico. From there, the goods were transshipped across Mexico to the Spanish treasure fleets, for shipment to Spain. The Spanish trading port of Manila facilitated this trade in 1572. Although Spain claimed islands in the Pacific, it did not encounter or claim the Hawaiian Islands. The control of Guam, Mariana Islands, Caroline Islands, and Palau came later, from the end of the 17th century, and remained under Spanish control until 1898.

=== 18th century ===
In the 18th century, Spain was concerned with increasing Russian and British influence in the Pacific Northwest of North America and sent several expeditions to explore and further shore up Spanish claims to the region.

Spain acquired the Louisiana territory from France in 1762 and then returned it in 1801; France then promptly sold it to the United States.

=== 19th century ===
Most of Spanish America was lost in the Spanish American wars of independence (1808–1833), led by the criollos.

The second half of the 1890s saw the final unravelling of Spanish America, which began with insurrections in Cuba (1895) and the Philippines (1896) and ended with the Spaniards' defeat at the hands of the United States in 1898.

== Organization and administration of empire ==
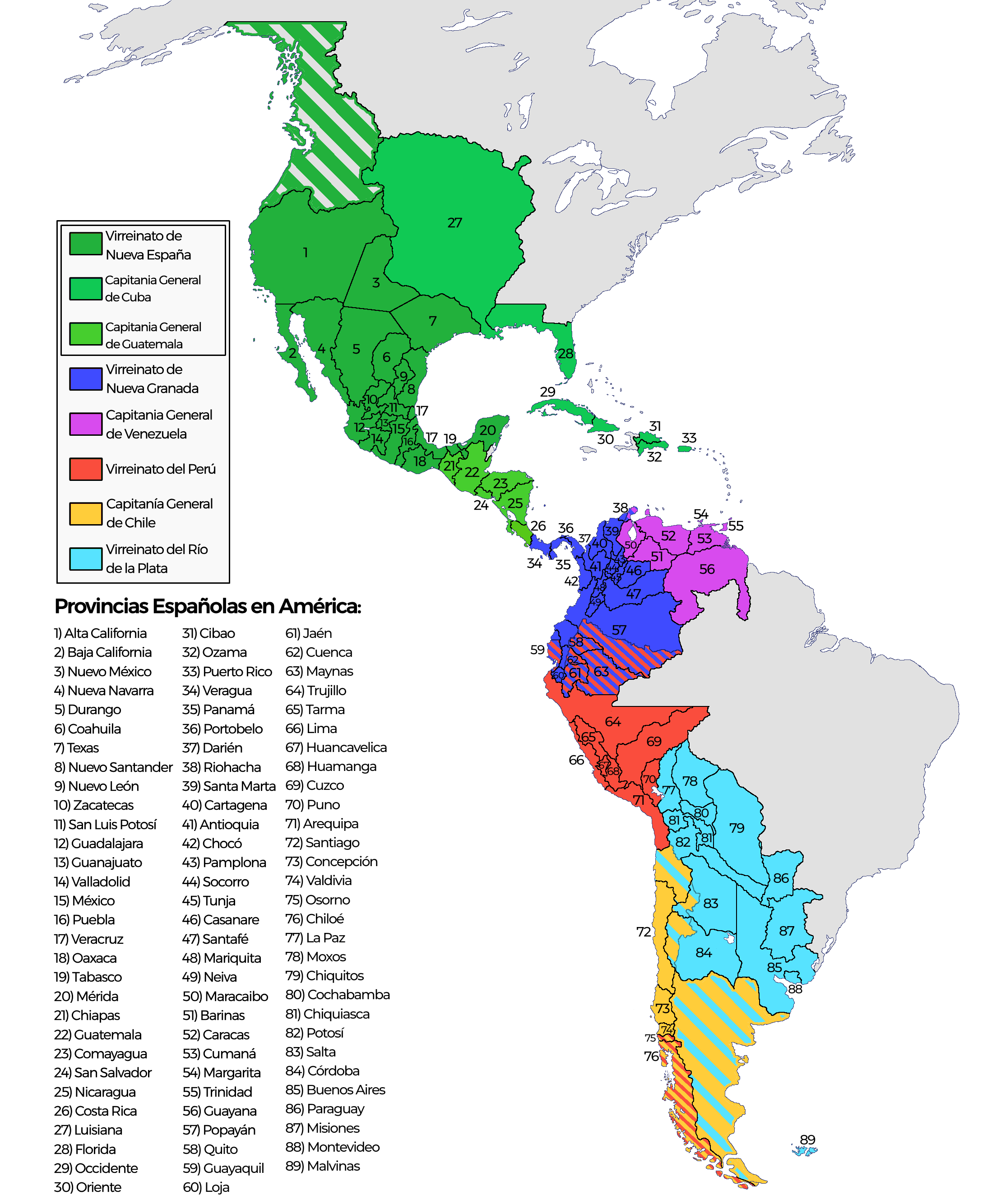
The Indies in the Americas, or Spanish America, circa 1803

The empire in the Indies was a newly established dependency of the kingdom of Castile alone, so crown power was not impeded by any existing cortes (i.e. parliament), administrative or ecclesiastical institution, or seigneurial group. The crown sought to establish and maintain control over its overseas possessions through a complex, hierarchical bureaucracy, which in many ways was decentralized. The crown asserted is authority and sovereignty of the territory and vassals it claimed, collected taxes, maintained public order, meted out justice, and established policies for governance of large indigenous populations. Many institutions established in Castile found expression in The Indies from the early colonial period. Spanish universities expanded to train lawyer-bureaucrats (letrados) for administrative positions in Spain and its overseas empire.

The end of the Habsburg dynasty in 1700 saw major administrative reforms in the eighteenth century under the Bourbon monarchy, starting with the first Spanish Bourbon monarch, Philip V (r. 1700–1746) and reaching its apogee under Charles III (r. 1759–1788). The reorganization of administration has been called "a revolution in government." Reforms sought to centralize government control through reorganization of administration, reinvigorate the economies of Spain and the Spanish empire through changes in mercantile and fiscal policies, defend Spanish colonies and territorial claims through the establishment of a standing military, undermine the power of the Catholic church, and rein in the power of the American-born elites.

=== Early institutions of governance ===
The crown relied on ecclesiastics as important councilors and royal officials in the governance of their overseas territories. Archbishop Juan Rodríguez de Fonseca, Isabella's confessor, was tasked with reining in Columbus's independence. He strongly influenced the formulation of colonial policy under the Catholic Monarchs, and was instrumental in establishing the Casa de Contratación (1503), which enabled crown control over trade and immigration. Ovando fitted out Magellan's voyage of circumnavigation, and became the first President of the Council of the Indies in 1524. Ecclesiastics also functioned as administrators overseas in the early Caribbean period, particularly Frey Nicolás de Ovando, who was sent to investigate the administration of Francisco de Bobadilla, the governor appointed to succeed Christopher Columbus. Later ecclesiastics served as interim viceroys, general inspectors (visitadores), and other high posts.

The crown established control over trade and emigration to the Indies with the 1503 establishment the Casa de Contratación (House of Trade) in Seville. Ships and cargoes were registered, and emigrants vetted to prevent migration of anyone not of old Christian heritage and facilitated the migration of families and women. In addition, the Casa de Contratación took charge of the fiscal organization, and of the organization and judicial control of the trade with the Indies.

The politics of asserting royal authority opposite to Columbus caused the suppression of his privileges in The Indies and the creation of territorial governance under royal authority. These governorates, also called as provinces, were the basic of the territorial government of the Indies, and arose as the territories were conquered and colonized. To carry out the expedition (entrada), which entailed exploration, conquest, and initial settlement of the territory, the king, as owner of the Indies, agreed capitulación (an itemized contract) with the specifics of the conditions of the expedition in a particular territory. The individual leaders of expeditions (adelantados) assumed the expenses of the venture and in return received as reward the grant from the government of the conquered territories; and in addition, they received instructions about treating the aborigens.

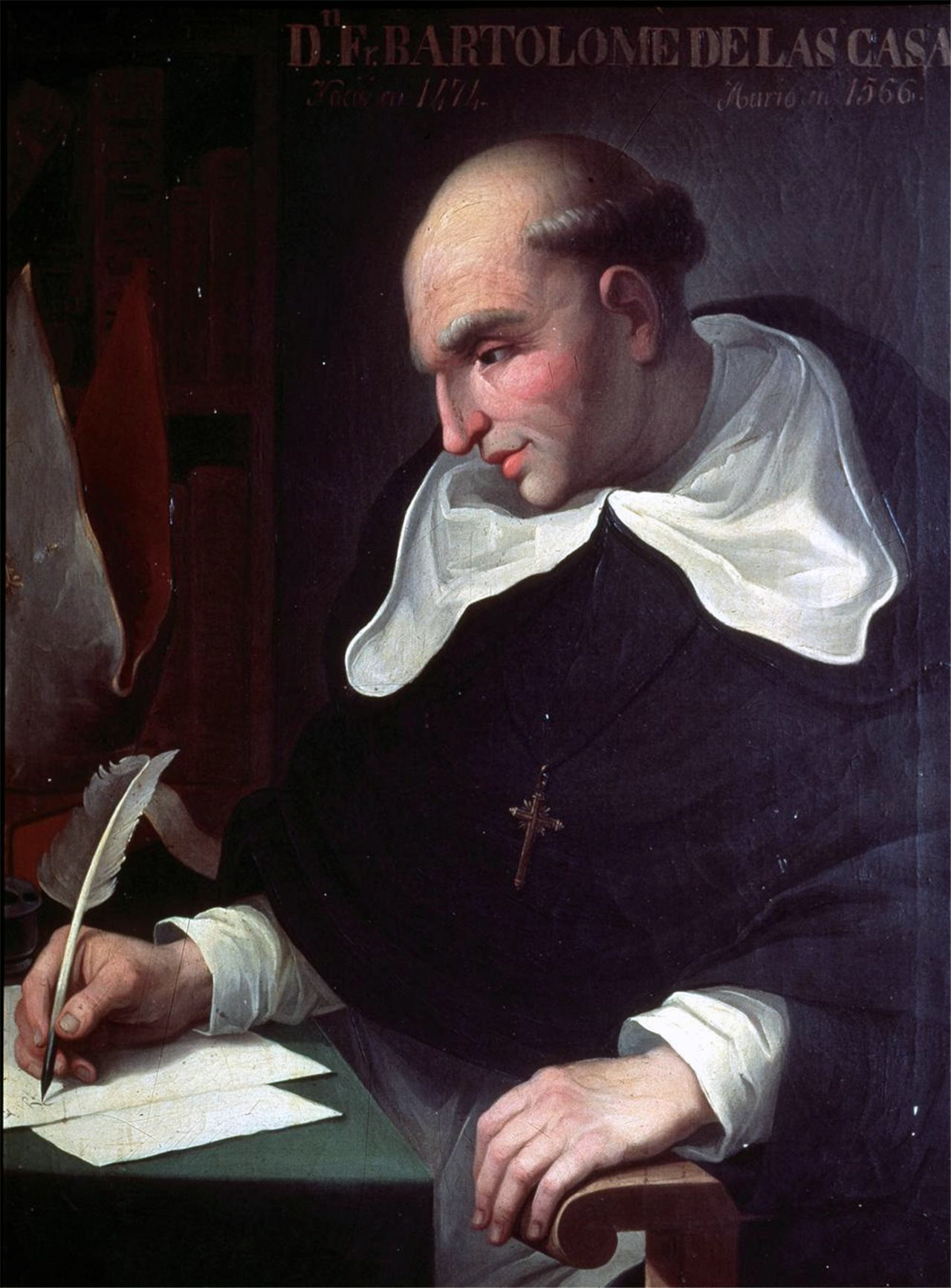
Fray Bartolomé de las Casas, Protector of the Indians

After the end of the period of conquests, it was necessary to manage extensive and different territories with a strong bureaucracy. In the face of the impossibility of the Castilian institutions to take care of the New World affairs, other new institutions were created.

As the basic political entity it was the governorate, or province. The governors exercised judicial ordinary functions of first instance, and prerogatives of government legislating by ordinances. To these political functions of the governor, it could be joined the military ones, according to military requirements, with the rank of Captain general. The office of captain general involved to be the supreme military chief of the whole territory and he was responsible for recruiting and providing troops, the fortification of the territory, the supply and the shipbuilding.

Provinces in the Spanish Empire had a royal treasury controlled by a set of officiales reales (royal officials). The officials of the royal treasury included up to four positions: a tesorero (treasurer), who guarded money on hand and made payments; a contador (accountant or comptroller), who recorded income and payments, maintained records, and interpreted royal instructions; a factor, who guarded weapons and supplies belonging to the king, and disposed of tribute collected in the province; and a veedor (overseer), who was responsible for contacts with native inhabitants of the province, and collected the king's share of any war booty. The treasury officials were appointed by the king, and were largely independent of the authority of the governor. Treasury officials were generally paid out of the income from the province and were normally prohibited from engaging in personal income-producing activities.

The indigenous populations in the Caribbean became the focus of the crown in its roles as sovereigns of the empire and patron of the Catholic Church. Spanish conquerors holding grants of indigenous labor in encomienda ruthlessly exploited them Spanish. A number of friars in the early period came to the vigorous defense of the indigenous populations, who were new converts to Christianity. Prominent Dominican friars in Santo Domingo, especially Antonio de Montesinos and Bartolomé de las Casas denounced the maltreatment and pressed the crown to act to protect the indigenous populations. The crown enacted Laws of Burgos (1513) and the Requerimiento to curb the power of the Spanish conquerors and give indigenous populations the opportunity to peacefully embrace Spanish authority and Christianity. Neither was effective in its purpose. Las Casas was officially appointed Protector of the Indians and spent his life arguing forcefully on their behalf. The New Laws of 1542, limiting the power of encomenderos, were a result.

Beginning in 1522 in the newly conquered Mexico, government units in the Spanish Empire had a royal treasury controlled by a set of officiales reales (royal officials). There were also sub-treasuries at important ports and mining districts. The officials of the royal treasury at each level of government typically included two to four positions: a tesorero (treasurer), the senior official who guarded money on hand and made payments; a contador (accountant or comptroller), who recorded income and payments, maintained records, and interpreted royal instructions; a factor, who guarded weapons and supplies belonging to the king, and disposed of tribute collected in the province; and a veedor (overseer), who was responsible for contacts with native inhabitants of the province, and collected the king's share of any war booty. The veedor, or overseer, position quickly disappeared in most jurisdictions, subsumed into the position of factor. Depending on the conditions in a jurisdiction, the position of factor/veedor was often eliminated, as well.

The treasury officials were appointed by the king, and were largely independent of the authority of the viceroy, audiencia president or governor. On the death, unauthorized absence, retirement or removal of a governor, the treasury officials would jointly govern the province until a new governor appointed by the king could take up his duties. Treasury officials were supposed to be paid out of the income from the province, and were normally prohibited from engaging in income-producing activities.

=== Spanish Law and indigenous peoples ===
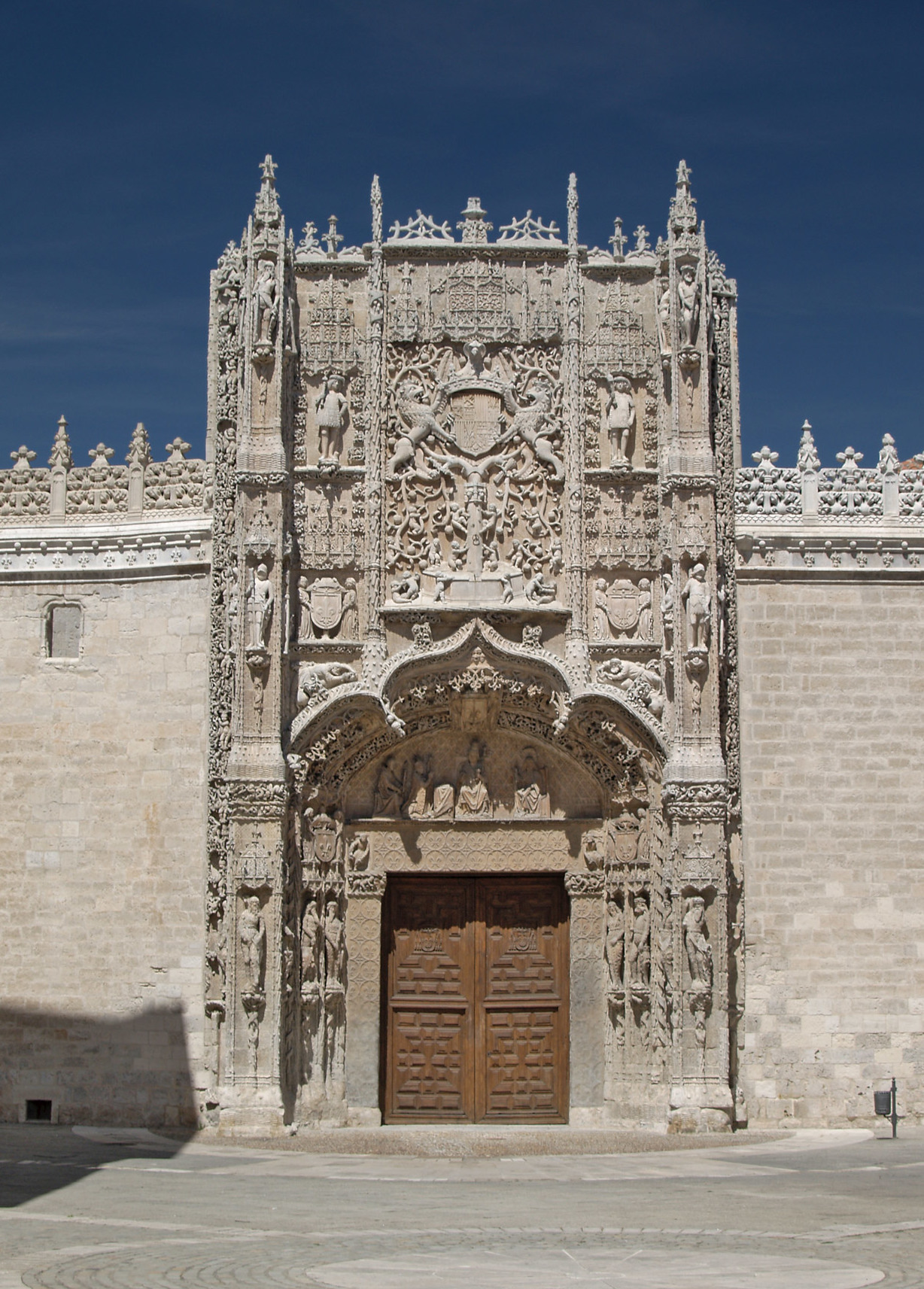
Colegio de San Gregorio, Valladolid, where the Laws of the Indies were promulgated

The protection of the indigenous populations from enslavement and exploitation by Spanish settlers was established in the Laws of Burgos, 1512–1513. The laws were the first codified set of laws governing the behavior of Spanish settlers in the Americas, particularly with regards to treatment of native Indians in the institution of the encomienda. They forbade the maltreatment of natives, and endorsed the Indian Reductions with attempts of conversion to Catholicism. Upon their failure to effectively protect the indigenous and following the Spanish conquest of the Aztec Empire and the Spanish conquest of Peru, more stringent laws to control conquerors' and settlers' exercise of power, especially their maltreatment of the indigenous populations, were promulgated, known as the New Laws (1542). The crown aimed to prevent the formation of an aristocracy in the Indies not under crown control.

Despite the fact that The Queen Isabel was the first monarch that laid the first stone for the protection of the indigenous peoples in her testament in which the Catholic monarch prohibited the enslavement of the indigenous peoples of the Americas. Then the first such in 1542; the legal thought behind them was the basis of modern International law. Taking advantage of their extreme remoteness from royal power, some colonists were disagree with the laws when they saw their power being reduced, forcing a partial suppression of these New Laws.

The Valladolid debate (1550–1551) was the first moral debate in European history to discuss the rights and treatment of a colonized people by colonizers. Held in the Colegio de San Gregorio, in the Spanish city of Valladolid, it was a moral and theological debate about the colonization of the Americas, its justification for the conversion to Catholicism and more specifically about the relations between the European settlers and the natives of the New World. It consisted of a number of opposing views about the way natives were to be integrated into colonial life, their conversion to Christianity and their rights and obligations. According to the French historian Jean Dumont The Valladolid debate was a major turning point in world history "In that moment in Spain appeared the dawn of the human rights".

=== Council of the Indies ===
In 1524 the Council of the Indies was established, following the system of Councils that advised the monarch and made decisions on his behalf about specific matters of government. Based in Castile, with the assignment of the governance of the Indies, it was thus responsible for drafting legislation, proposing the appointments to the King for civil government as well as ecclesiastical appointments, and pronouncing judicial sentences; as maximum authority in the overseas territories, the Council of the Indies took over both the institutions in the Indies as the defense of the interests of the Crown, the Catholic Church, and of indigenous peoples. With the 1508 papal grant to the crown of the Patronato real, the crown, rather than the pope, exercised absolute power over the Catholic Church in the Americas and the Philippines, a privilege the crown zealously guarded against erosion or incursion. Crown approval through the Council of the Indies was needed for the establishment of bishoprics, building of churches, appointment of all clerics.

In 1721, at the beginning of the Bourbon monarchy, the crown transferred the main responsibility for governing the overseas empire from the Council of the Indies to the Ministry of the Navy and the Indies, which were subsequently divided into two separate ministries in 1754.

=== Viceroyalties ===
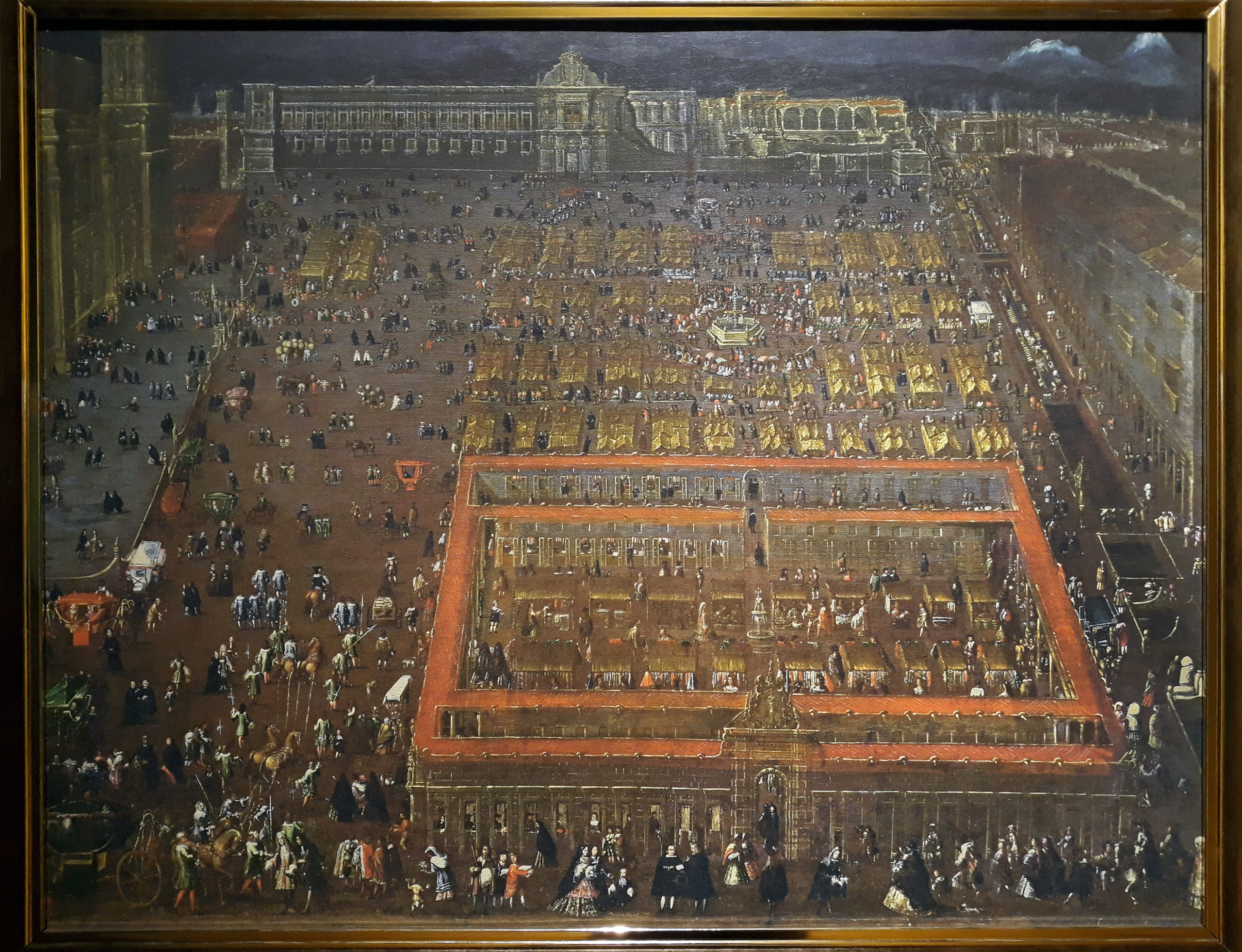
View of the Plaza Mayor of Mexico City and the viceroy's palace, by Cristóbal de Villalpando, 1695

The impossibility of the physical presence of the monarch and the necessity of strong royal governance in the Indies resulted in the appointment of viceroys ("vice-kings"), the direct representation of the monarch, in both civil and ecclesiastical spheres. Viceroyalties were the largest territory unit of administration in the civil and religious spheres and the boundaries of civil and ecclesiastical governance coincided by design, to ensure crown control over both bureaucracies. Until the eighteenth century, there were just two viceroyalties, with the Viceroyalty of New Spain (founded 1535) administering North America, a portion of the Caribbean, and the Philippines, and the viceroyalty of Peru (founded 1542) having jurisdiction over Spanish South America. Viceroys served as the vice-patron of the Catholic Church, including the Inquisition, established in the seats of the viceroyalties (Mexico City and Peru). Viceroys were responsible for good governance of their territories, economic development, and humane treatment of the indigenous populations.

In the eighteenth-century reforms, the Viceroyalty of Peru was reorganized, splitting off portions to form the Viceroyalty of New Granada (Colombia) (1739) and the Viceroyalty of Rio de la Plata (Argentina) (1776), leaving Peru with jurisdiction over Peru, Charcas, and Chile. Viceroys were of high social standing, almost without exception born in Spain, and served fixed terms.

The most important institution of the Spanish administration in the Indies was the viceroyalty. Although it was not an institution in itself—the principal administrative body being the Royal Audiencia—it concentrated most of the royal authority. The viceroy was the king's alter ego, enjoying extensive civil and ecclesiastical privileges until the reforms of Charles III, which reduced the powers of the viceroys by creating the office of Regent of the Royal Audiencia, who thereafter presided over the Audiencia.

==== Evolution of the viceroyalties of the Spanish Empire in the Americas ====
Spanish colonial viceroyalties					Successor states
1492–1536	1535–1717	1535–1717	1723–1739	1739–1824	1824–1831
Indies (1492–1536)	New Spain (1535–1821)	New Spain (1535–1821)	New Spain (1535–1821)	New Spain (1535–1821)	Empire of Mexico (1821–1823)
Indies (1492–1536)	Perú (1542–1824)	New Granada (1717–1723)	Perú (1542–1824)	New Granada (1739–1822)	Republic of Colombia (1819–1831)
Indies (1492–1536)	Perú (1542–1824)	Perú (1542–1824)	Perú (1542–1824)	Perú (1542–1824)	Republic of Perú (1821–1836)
Indies (1492–1536)	Perú (1542–1824)	Perú (1542–1824)	Perú (1542–1824)	Río de la Plata (1776–1811)	United Provinces of the Río de la Plata (1811–1831)

=== Audiencias, the High Courts ===
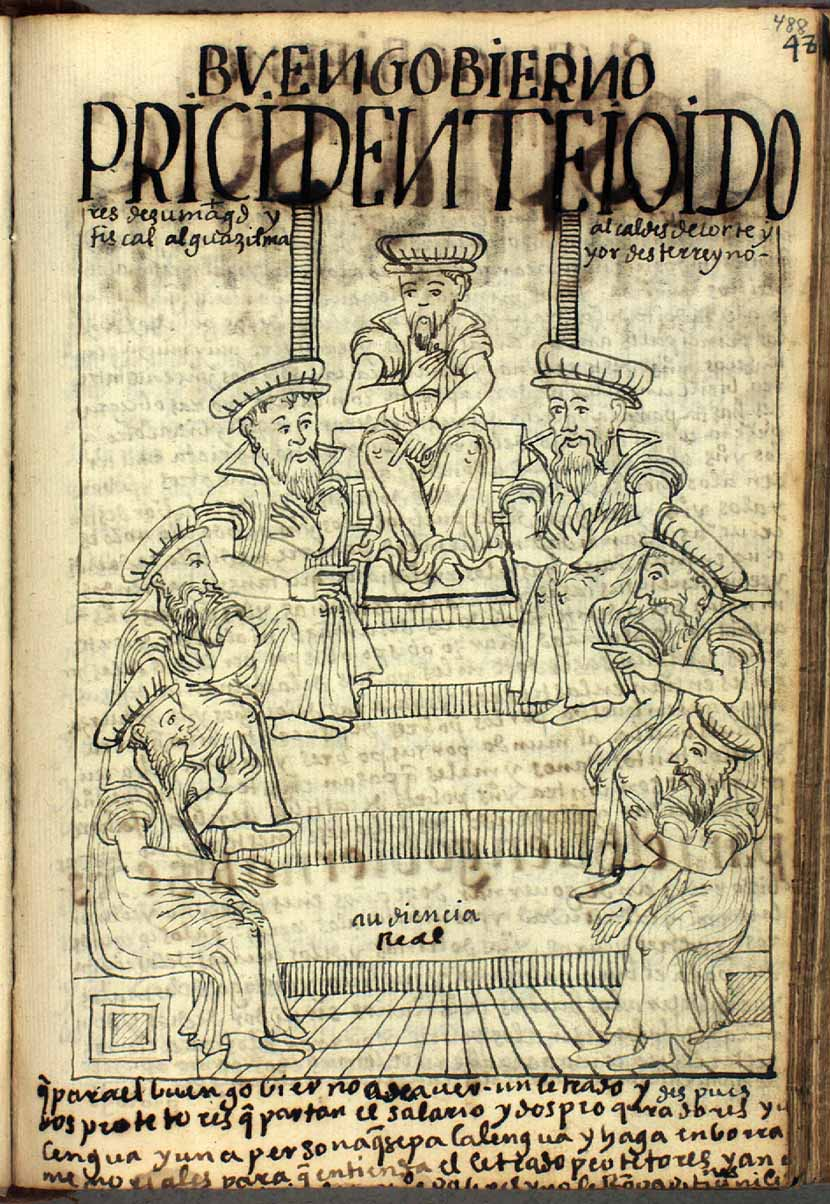
Members of the Real Audiencia (Royal Audience) of Lima, the presidente, alcaldes de corte, fiscal and alguacil mayor. (Nueva Crónica y Buen Gobierno, p. 488)

The Audiencias were initially constituted by the crown as a key administrative institution with royal authority and loyalty to the crown as opposed to conquerors and first settlers. Although constituted as the highest judicial authority in their territorial jurisdiction, they also had executive and legislative authority, and served as the executive on an interim basis. Judges (oidores) held "formidable power. Their role in judicial affairs and in overseeing the implementation of royal legislation made their decisions important for the communities they served." Since their appointments were for life or the pleasure of the monarch, they had a continuity of power and authority that viceroys and captains-general lacked because of their shorter-term appointments. They were the "center of the administrative system [and] gave the government of the Indies a strong basis of permanence and continuity."

Their main function was judicial, as a court of justice of second instance —court of appeal— in penal and civil matters, but also the Audiencias were courts the first instance in the city where it had its headquarters, and also in the cases involving the Royal Treasury. Besides court of justice, the Audiencias had functions of government as counterweight the authority of the viceroys, since they could communicate with both the Council of the Indies and the king without the requirement of requesting authorization from the viceroy. This direct correspondence of the Audiencia with the Council of the Indies made it possible for the council to give the Audiencia direction on general aspects of government.

Audiencias were a significant base of power and influence for American-born elites, starting in the late sixteenth century, with nearly a quarter of appointees being born in the Indies by 1687. During a financial crisis in the late seventeenth century, the crown began selling Audiencia appointments, and American-born Spaniards held 45% of Audiencia appointments. Although there were restrictions of appointees' ties to local elite society and participation in the local economy, they acquired dispensations from the cash-strapped crown. Audiencia judgments and other functions became more tied to the locality and less to the crown and impartial justice.

During the Bourbon Reforms in the mid-eighteenth century, the crown systematically sought to centralize power in its own hands and diminish that of its overseas possessions, appointing peninsular-born Spaniards to Audiencias. American-born elite men complained bitterly about the change, since they lost access to power that they had enjoyed for nearly a century.

==== Evolution of the audiencias (sometimes referred to as kingdoms) of the Spanish Empire in the Americas ====
Spanish colonial kingdoms					Spanish colonial kingdoms and successor states	
1527–1542	1542–1550	1550–1570	1570–1609	1609–1838	1838–1898	1898–present
México (1527–1821)	México (1527–1821)	México (1527–1821)	México (1527–1821)	México (1527–1821)	Mexico (1821–)	
México (1527–1821)	México (1527–1821)	New Galicia (1548–1821)	New Galicia (1548–1821)	New Galicia (1548–1821)	Mexico (1821–)	
México (1527–1821)	Guatemala (1542–1564)	Guatemala (1542–1564)	Guatemala (1570–1821)	Guatemala (1570–1821)	(Federal Republic of Central America) Central America (1823–1841)	Guatemala (1841–)
St. Domingo (1527–1799)	St. Domingo (1527–1799)	St. Domingo (1527–1799)	St. Domingo (1527–1799)	Cuba (1800–1838)	West Cuba (1838–1898)	Cuba (1902–)
St. Domingo (1527–1799)	St. Domingo (1527–1799)	St. Domingo (1527–1799)	St. Domingo (1527–1799)	Cuba (1800–1838)	East Cuba (1838–1898)	Cuba (1902–)
St. Domingo (1527–1799)	St. Domingo (1527–1799)	St. Domingo (1527–1799)	St. Domingo (1527–1799)	Cuba (1800–1838)	Puerto Rico (1832–1898)	Puerto Rico (US Territory)
St. Domingo (1527–1799)	St. Domingo (1527–1799)	St. Domingo (1527–1799)	St. Domingo (1527–1799)	Cuba (1800–1838)	St. Domingo (1861–1865)	(Dominican Republic) Dominican Rep. (1865–)
St. Domingo (1527–1799)	St. Domingo (1527–1799)	St. Domingo (1527–1799)	St. Domingo (1527–1799)	Venezuela (1786–1815)	(Gran Colombia) Colombia (1819–)	Venezuela (1830–)
Tierra Firme (1527–1542)	Perú (1543–1821)	Tierra Firme (1565–1716)	Tierra Firme (1722–1750)	New Granada (1550–1819)	(Gran Colombia) Colombia (1819–)	Panama (1903–)
Tierra Firme (1527–1542)	Perú (1543–1821)	New Granada (1550–1819)	New Granada (1550–1819)	New Granada (1550–1819)	(Gran Colombia) Colombia (1819–)	Colombia (1819–)
Tierra Firme (1527–1542)	Perú (1543–1821)	Quito (1564–1717)	New Granada (1550–1819)	Quito (1722–1822)	(Gran Colombia) Colombia (1819–)	Ecuador (1830–)
Tierra Firme (1527–1542)	Perú (1543–1821)	Perú (1543–1821)	Perú (1543–1821)	Perú (1543–1821)	(Peru) Perú (1822–)	(Peru) Perú (1822–)
Tierra Firme (1527–1542)	Perú (1543–1821)	Perú (1543–1821)	Perú (1543–1821)	Cuzco (1787–1825)	South Perú (1836–1839)	(Peru) Perú (1822–)
Tierra Firme (1527–1542)	Perú (1543–1821)	Chile (1565–1574)	Perú (1543–1821)	Chile (1609–1817)	Chile (1817–)	
Tierra Firme (1527–1542)	Perú (1543–1821)	Charcas (1559–1825)	Charcas (1559–1825)	Charcas (1559–1825)	Bolivia (1825–)	
Tierra Firme (1527–1542)	Perú (1543–1821)	Buenos Aires (1663–1671)	Charcas (1559–1825)	Buenos Aires (1785–1811)	Argentina (1811–)	

=== Civil administrative districts ===
During the early colonial era and under the Habsburgs, the crown established a regional layer of colonial jurisdiction in the institution of Corregimiento, which was between the Audiencia and town councils. Corregimiento expanded "royal authority from the urban centers into the countryside and over the indigenous population." As with many colonial institutions, corregimiento had its roots in Castile when the Catholic Monarchs centralize power over municipalities. In the Indies, corregimiento initially functioned to bring control over Spanish settlers who exploited the indigenous populations held in encomienda, to protect the shrinking indigenous populations and prevent the formation of an aristocracy of conquerors and powerful settlers. The royal official in charge of a district was the Corregidor, who was appointed by the viceroy, usually for a five-year term. Corregidores collected the tribute from indigenous communities and regulated forced indigenous labor. Alcaldías mayores were larger districts with a royal appointee, the Alcalde mayor.

As the indigenous populations declined, the need for corregimiento decreased and then suppressed, with the alcaldía mayor remaining an institution until it was replaced in the eighteenth-century Bourbon Reforms by royal officials, Intendants. The salary of officials during the Habsburg era were paltry, but the corregidor or alcalde mayor in densely populated areas of indigenous settlement with a valuable product could use his office for personal enrichment. As with many other royal posts, these positions were sold, starting in 1677. The Bourbon-era intendants were appointed and relatively well paid.

=== Ecclesiastical organization ===
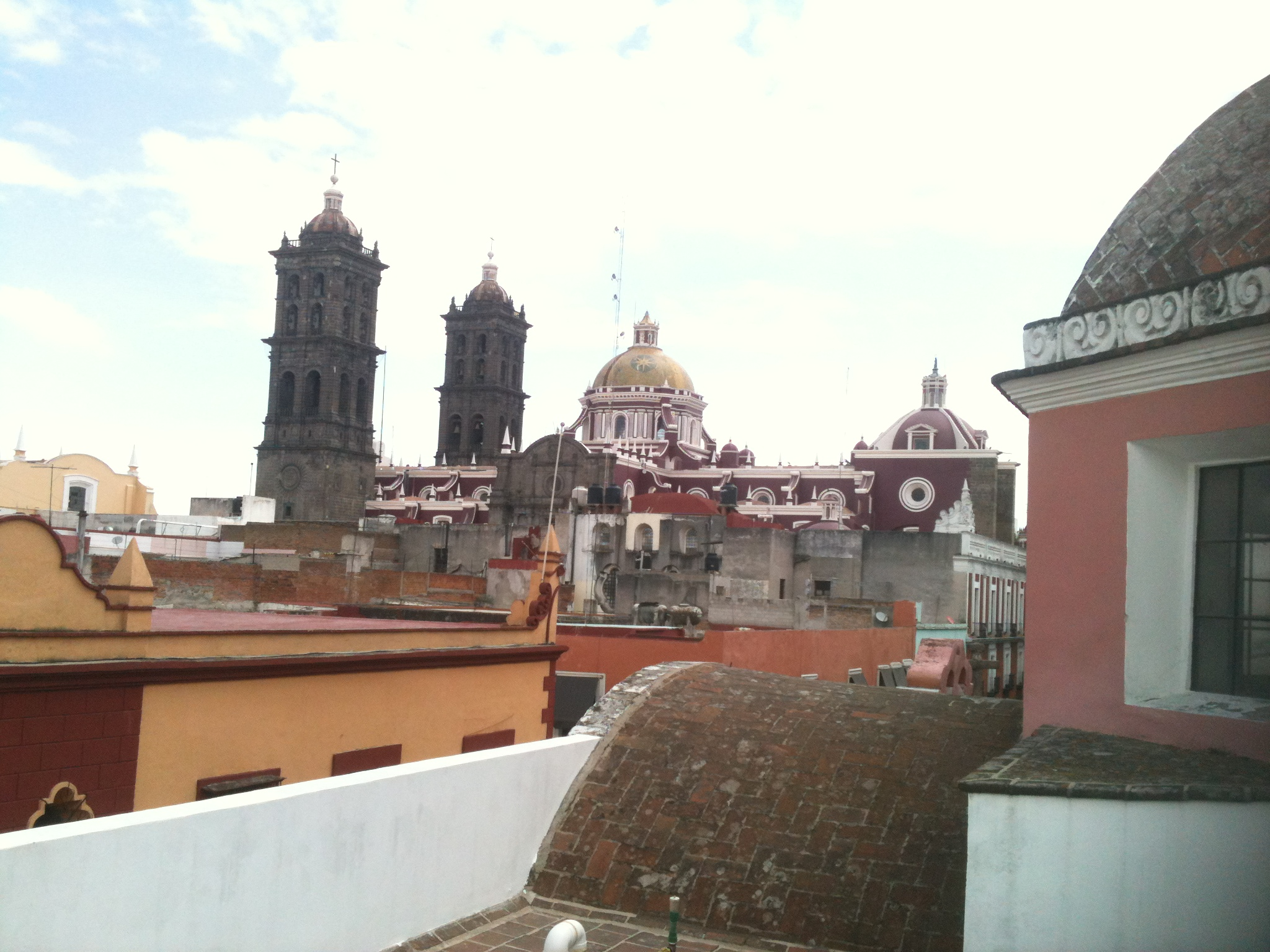
Puebla Cathedral

During the early colonial period, the crown authorized friars of Catholic religious orders (Franciscans, Dominicans, and Augustinians) to function as priests during the conversion of indigenous populations. During the early Age of Discovery, the diocesan clergy in Spain was poorly educated and considered of a low moral standing, and the Catholic Monarchs were reluctant to allow them to spearhead evangelization. Each order set up networks of parishes in the various regions (provinces), sited in existing Indian settlements, where Christian churches were built and where evangelization of the indigenous was based. However, after the 1550s, the crown increasingly favored the diocesan clergy over the religious orders since the diocesan clergy was under the direct authority of the crown, while religious orders were with their own internal regulations and leadership. The crown had authority to draw the boundaries for dioceses and parishes. The creation of the ecclesiastical hierarchy with priests who not members of religious orders, those known as the diocesan or secular clergy, marked a turning point in the crown's control over the religious sphere. In 1574, Philip II promulgated the Order of Patronage (Ordenaza del Patronato) ordering the religious orders to turn over their parishes to the secular clergy, a policy that secular clerics had long sought for the central areas of empire, with their large indigenous populations. Although implementation was slow and incomplete, it was an assertion of royal power over the clergy and the quality of parish priests improved, since the Ordenanza mandated competitive examination to fill vacant positions. Religious orders along with the Jesuits embarked on further evangelization in frontier regions of the empire. The Jesuits resisted crown control, refusing to pay the tithe on their estates that supported the ecclesiastical hierarchy and came into conflict with bishops. The most prominent example is in Puebla, Mexico, when Bishop Juan de Palafox y Mendoza was driven from his bishopric by the Jesuits. The bishop challenged the Jesuits' continuing to hold Indian parishes and function as priests without the required royal licenses. His fall from power is viewed as an example of the weakening of the crown in the mid-seventeenth century since it failed to protect their duly appointed bishop. The crown expelled the Jesuits from Spain and The Indies in 1767 during the Bourbon Reforms.

=== Cabildos or town councils ===
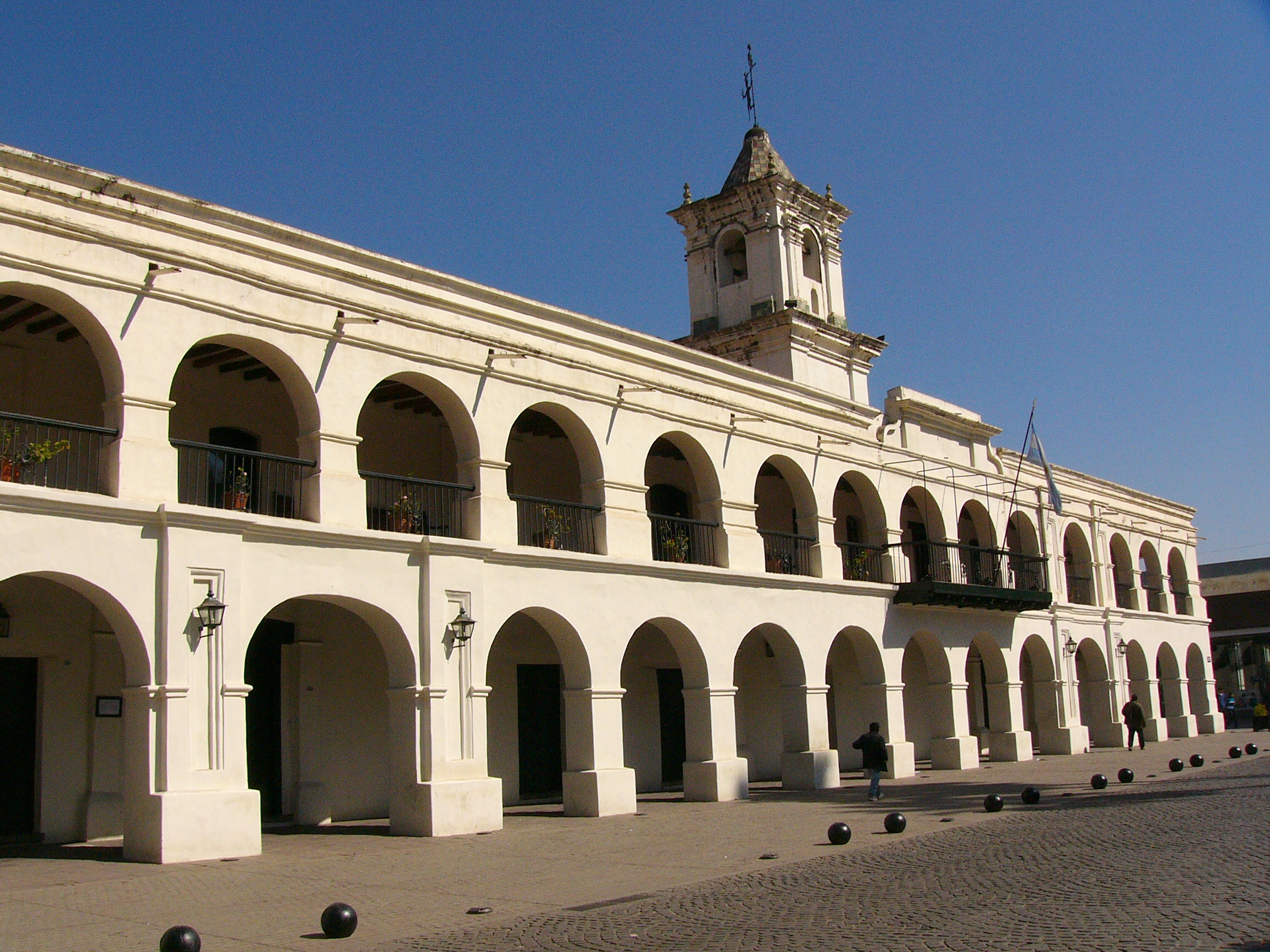
Cabildo in the city of Salta (Argentina)

Spanish settlers sought to live in towns and cities, with governance being accomplished through the town council or Cabildo. The cabildo was composed of the prominent residents (vecinos) of the municipality, so that governance was restricted to a male elite, with majority of the population exercising power. Cities were governed on the same pattern as in Spain and in the Indies the city was the framework of Spanish life. The cities were Spanish and the countryside indigenous. In areas of previous indigenous empires with settled populations, the crown also melded existing indigenous rule into a Spanish pattern, with the establishment of cabildos and the participation of indigenous elites as officials holding Spanish titles. There were a variable number of councilors (regidores), depending on the size of the town, also two municipal judges (alcaldes menores), who were judges of first instance, and also other officials as police chief, inspector of supplies, court clerk, and a public herald. They were in charge of distributing land to the neighbors, establishing local taxes, dealing with the public order, inspecting jails and hospitals, preserving the roads and public works such as irrigation ditches and bridges, supervising the public health, regulating the festive activities, monitoring market prices, or the protection of Indians.

After the reign of Philip II, the municipal offices, including the councilors, were auctioned to alleviate the need for money of the Crown, even the offices could also be sold, which became hereditary, so that the government of the cities went on to hands of urban oligarchies. In order to control the municipal life, the Crown ordered the appointment of corregidores and alcaldes mayores to exert greater political control and judicial functions in minor districts. Their functions were governing the respective municipalities, administering of justice and being appellate judges in the alcaldes menores' judgments, but only the corregidor could preside over the cabildo. However, both charges were also put up for sale freely since the late 16th century.

Most Spanish settlers came to the Indies as permanent residents, established families and businesses, and sought advancement in the colonial system, such as membership of cabildos, so that they were in the hands of local, American-born (crillo) elites. During the Bourbon era, even when the crown systematically appointed peninsular-born Spaniards to royal posts rather than American-born, the cabildos remained in the hands of local elites.

=== Frontier institutions – presidio and mission ===
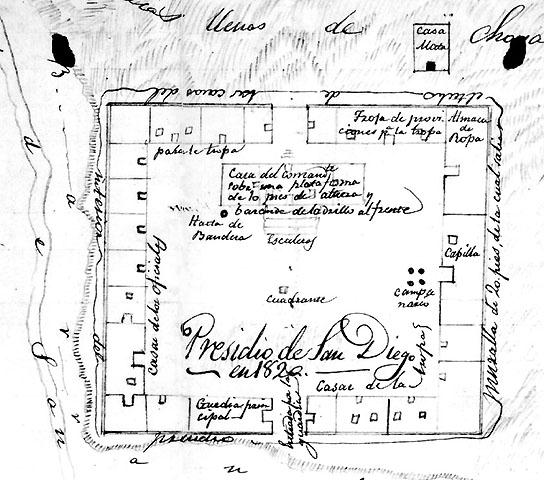
The San Diego presidio in California

As the empire expanded into areas of less dense indigenous populations, the crown created a chain of presidios, military forts or garrisons, that provided Spanish settlers protection from Indian attacks. In Mexico during the sixteenth-century Chichimeca War, presidios guarded the transit of silver from the mines of Zacatecas to Mexico City. As many as 60 salaried soldiers were garrisoned in presidios. Presidios had resident commanders, who set up commercial enterprises of imported merchandise, selling it to soldiers as well as Indian allies.

The other frontier institution was the religious mission to convert the indigenous populations. Missions were established with royal authority through the Patronato real. The Jesuits were effective missionaries in frontier areas until their expulsion from Spain and its empire in 1767. The Franciscans took over some former Jesuit missions and continued the expansion of areas incorporated into the empire. Although their primary focus was on religious conversion, missionaries served as "diplomatic agents, peace emissaries to hostile tribes ... and they were also expected to hold the line against nomadic nonmissionary Indians as well as other European powers." On the frontier of empire, Indians were seen as sin razón, ("without reason"); non-Indian populations were described as gente de razón ("people of reason"), who could be mixed-race castas or black and had greater social mobility in frontier regions.

== Ordering colonial society – social structure and legal status ==
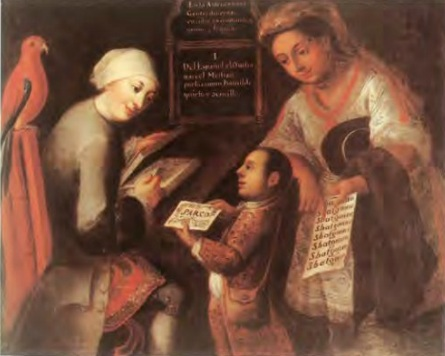
Castas painting of a Mestizo Child, Spanish man, and Indian Woman by José Joaquín Magón, Mexico Late Eighteenth Century

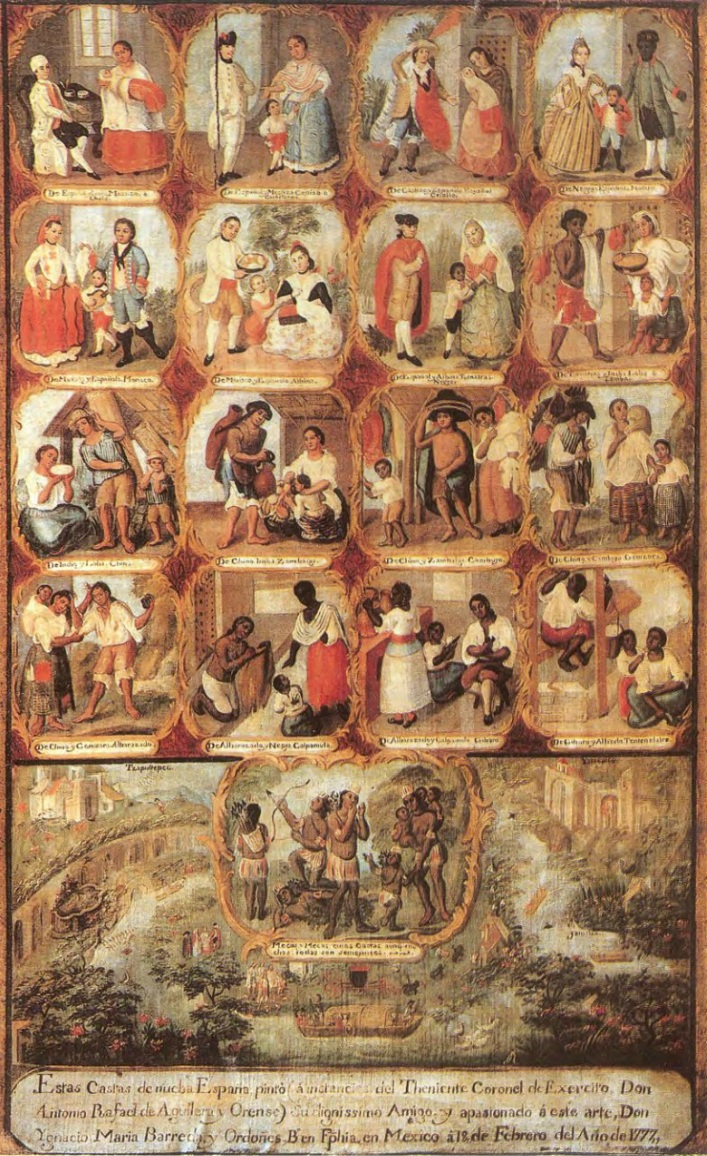
Depiction of castas in Mexico. Ignacio Maria Barreda, 1777

Codes regulated the status of individuals and groups in the empire in both the civil and religious spheres, with Spaniards (peninsular- and American-born) monopolizing positions of economic privilege and political power. Royal law and Catholicism codified and maintained hierarchies of class and race, while all were subjects of the crown and mandated to be Catholic. The crown took active steps to establish and maintain Catholicism by evangelizing the pagan indigenous populations, as well as African slaves not previously Christian, and incorporating them into Christendom. Catholicism remains the dominant religion in Spanish America. The crown also imposed restrictions on emigration to the Americas, excluding Jews and crypto-Jews, Protestants, and foreigners, using the Casa de Contratación to vet potential emigres and issue licenses to travel.

The portrait to the right was most likely used as a souvenir. For those who traveled to the New World and back it was common to bring back souvenirs as there were a great interest in what the New World meant. The land would be significantly different but there was a special emphasis put on the emerging mixed races. Not only was there whites mixing with blacks but there were natives mixing with both whites and blacks as well. From a Spanish viewpoint, the castas paintings would most-likely have provided a sort of sense to the madness that was mixed races. There were political implications of this portrait as well. The mestizo child appears to be literate with a satisfied grin facing his father alluding to the opportunity the child has due to his father being European.

A central question from the time of first Contact with indigenous populations was their relationship to the crown and to Christianity. Once those issues were resolved theologically, in practice the crown sought to protect its new vassals. It did so by dividing peoples of the Americas into the República de Indios, the native populations, and the República de Españoles. The República de Españoles was the entire Hispanic sector, composed of Spaniards, but also Africans (enslaved and free), as well as mixed-race castas.

Within the República de Indios, men were explicitly excluded from ordination to the Catholic priesthood and obligation for military service as well as the jurisdiction of the Inquisition. Indians under colonial rule who lived in pueblos de indios had crown protections due to their statuses as legal minors. Due to the lack of prior exposure to the Catholic faith, Queen Isabella had declared all indigenous peoples her subjects. This differed from people of the African continent because these populations had theoretically been exposed to Catholicism and chose not to follow it. This religious differentiation is important because it gave indigenous communities legal protections from members of the Républica de Españoles. In fact, an often overlooked aspect of the colonial legal system was that members of the pueblos de indios could appeal to the crown and circumvent the legal system in the Républica de Españoles. The statuses of the indigenous populations as legal minors barred them from becoming priests, but the républica de indios operated with a fair amount of autonomy. Missionaries also acted as guardians against encomendero exploitation. Indian communities had protections of traditional lands by the creation of community lands that could not be alienated, the fondo legal. They managed their own affairs internally through Indian town government under the supervision of royal officials, the corregidores and alcaldes mayores. Although indigenous men were barred from becoming priests, indigenous communities created religious confraternities under priestly supervision, which functioned as burial societies for their individual members, but also organized community celebrations for their patron saint. Blacks also had separate confraternities, which likewise contributed to community formation and cohesion, reinforcing identity within a Christian institution.

Conquest and evangelization were inseparable in Spanish America. The first order to make the trip to the Americas were the Franciscans, led by Pedro de Gante. Franciscans believed that living a spiritual life of poverty and holiness was the best way to be an example that inspired others to convert. The friars would walk into the towns barefoot as a display of their surrender to God in a sort of theater of conversion. With this began the practice of evangelization of the peoples of the new world as supported by the Spanish government. Religious orders in Spanish America had their own internal structures and were organizationally autonomous, but nonetheless were very important to the structure of colonial society. They had their own resources and hierarchies. Though some orders took vows of poverty, by the time the second wave of friars came to the Americas and as their numbers grew, the orders began amassing wealth and thus became key economic players. The church, as this wealthy power, had huge estates and built large constructions such as gilded monasteries and cathedrals. Priests themselves also became wealthy landowners. Orders like the Franciscans also established schools for the indigenous elites as well as hired indigenous laborers, thereby shifting the dynamics in the indigenous communities and their relationship to the Spanish.

After the fall of the Aztec and Inca empires, the rulers of the empires were replaced by the Spanish monarchy, while retaining much of the hierarchical indigenous structures. The crown recognized noble status of elite Indians, giving them exemption from the head-tax and the right to use the nobles title don and doña. Indigenous noblemen were a key group for the administration of the Spanish Empire, since they served as intermediaries between crown officials and indigenous communities. Indigenous noblemen could serve on cabildos, ride horses, and carry firearms. The crown's recognition of indigenous elites as nobles meant that these men were incorporated into colonial system with privileges separating them from Indian commoners. Indian noblemen were thus crucial to the governance of the huge indigenous population. Through their continued loyalty to the crown, they maintained their positions of power within their communities but also served as agents of colonial governance. The Spanish Empire's use of local elites to rule large populations that are ethnically distinct from the rulers has long been practiced by earlier empires. Indian caciques were crucial in the early Spanish period, especially when the economy was still based on extracting tribute and labor from commoner Indians who had rendered goods and service to their overlords in the prehispanic period. Caciques mobilized their populations for encomenderos and, later, repartimiento recipients chosen by the crown. The noblemen became the officers of the cabildo in indigenous communities, regulating internal affairs, as well as defending the communities' rights in court. In Mexico, this was facilitated by the 1599 establishment of the General Indian Court (Juzgado General de Indios), which heard legal disputes in which indigenous communities and individuals were engaged. With legal mechanisms for dispute-resolution, there were relatively few outbreaks of violence and rebellion against crown rule. Eighteenth-century rebellions in long-peaceful areas of Mexico, the Tzeltal Rebellion of 1712 and most spectacularly in Peru with the Tupac Amaru Rebellion (1780–81) saw indigenous noblemen leading uprisings against the Spanish state.

In the República de Españoles, class and race hierarchies were codified in institutional structures. Spaniards emigrating to The Indies were to be Old Christians of pure Christian heritage, with the crown excluding New Christians, converts from Judaism and their descendants, because of their suspect religious status. The crown established the Inquisition in Mexico and Peru in 1571, and later Cartagena de Indias (Colombia), to guard Catholics from the influence of crypto-Jews, Protestants, and foreigners. Church practices established and maintained racial hierarchies by recording baptism, marriage, and burial were kept separate registers for different racial groups. Churches were also physically divided by race.

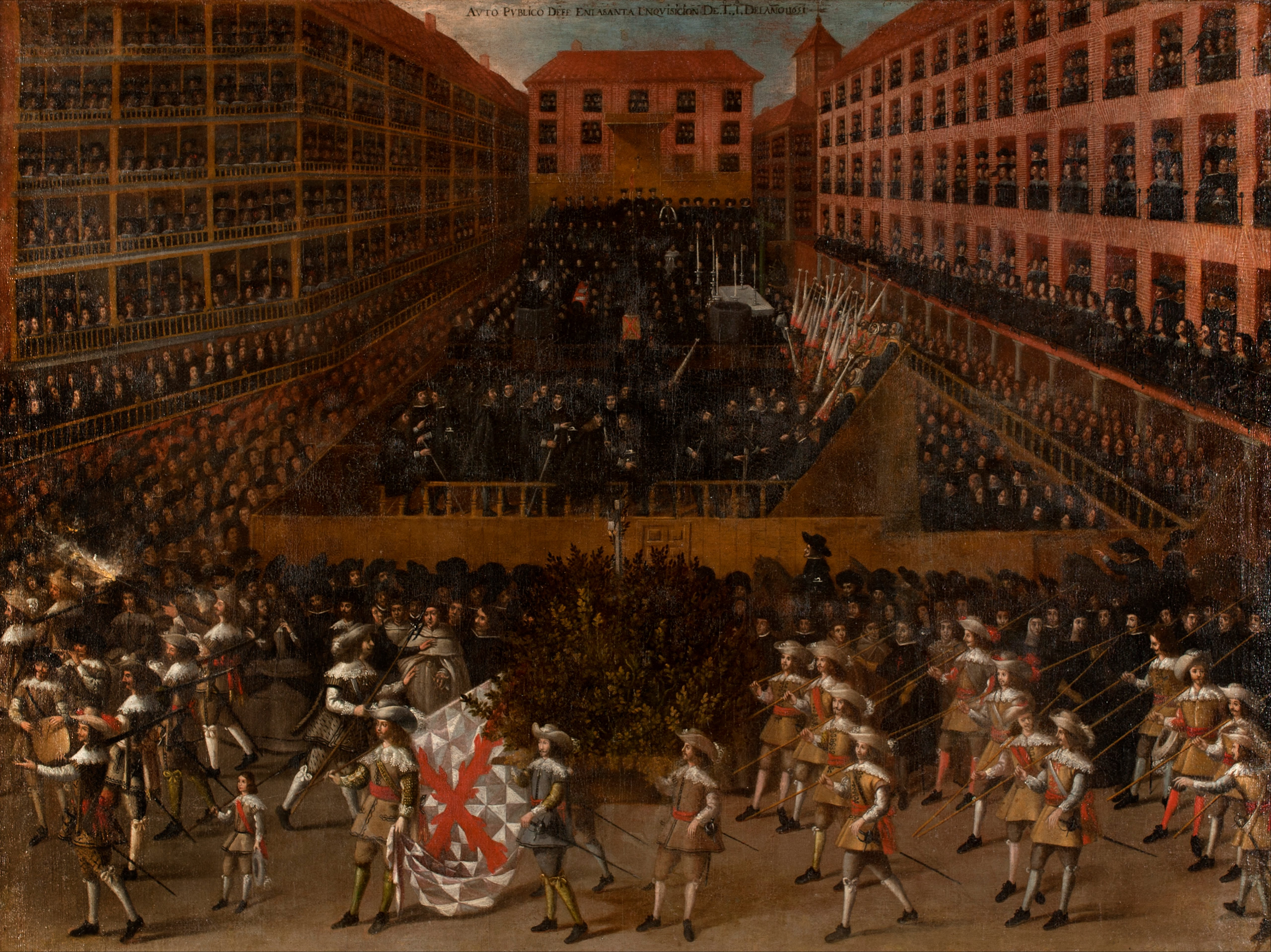
Auto de Fe in Toledo, Spain 1651. Civil officials oversaw the corporal punishment of those convicted by the Inquisition in public ceremonies.

Race mixture (mestizaje) was a fact of colonial society, with the three racial groups, European whites (españoles), Africans (negros), and Indians (indios) producing mixed-race offspring, or castas. There was a pyramid of racial status with the apex being the small number of European white (españoles), a slightly larger number of mixed-race castas, who, like the whites were mainly urban dwelling, and the largest populations were Indians living in communities in the countryside. Although Indians were classified as part of the República de Indios, their offspring of unions with Españoles and Africans were castas. White-Indian mixtures were more socially acceptable in the Hispanic sphere, with the possibility over generations of mixed-race offspring being classified as Español. Any offspring with African ancestry could never remove the "stain" of their racial heritage, since Africans were seen as "natural slaves". Eighteenth-century paintings depicted elites' ideas of the sistema de castas in hierarchical order, but there was some fluidity in the system rather than absolute rigidity. Men of color began to apply to the Royal and Pontifical University of Mexico, but in 1688 Bishop Juan de Palafox y Mendoza attempted to prevent their entrance by drafting new regulations barring blacks and mulattoes. In small Mexican parishes, dark complected priests served while their mixed-race heritage was left unacknowledged. In 1776, the crown attempted to prevent marriages between racially unequal partners by issuing the Royal Pragmatic on Marriage, taking approval of marriages away from the couple and placing it in their parents' hands. The marriage between Luisa de Abrego, a free black domestic servant from Seville and Miguel Rodríguez, a white Segovian conquistador in 1565 in St. Augustine (Spanish Florida), is the first known and recorded Christian marriage anywhere in the continental United States.

The criminal justice system in Spanish cities and towns meted out justice depending on the severity of the crime and the class, race, age, health, and gender of the accused. Non-whites (blacks and mixed-race castas) were far more often and more severely punished, while Indians, considered legal minors, were not expected to behave better and were more leniently punished. Royal and municipal legislation attempted to control the behavior of black slaves, who were subject to a curfew, could not carry arms, and were prohibited from running away from their masters. As the urban, white, lower-class (plebeian) population increased, they too were increasingly subject to criminal arrest and punishment. Capital punishment was seldom employed, with the exception of sodomy and recalcitrant prisoners of the Inquisition, whose deviation from Christian orthodoxy was considered extreme. However, only the civil sphere could exercise capital punishment and prisoners were "relaxed", that is, released to civil authorities. Often criminals served sentences of hard labor in textile workshops (obrajes), presidio service on the frontier, and as sailors on royal ships. Royal pardons to ordinary criminals were often accorded on the celebration of a royal marriage, coronation, or birth.

Elite Spanish men had access to special corporate protections (fueros) and had exemptions by virtue of their membership in a particular group. One important privilege was their being judged by the court of their corporation. Members of the clergy held the fuero eclesiástico were judged by ecclesiastical courts, whether the offense was civil or criminal. In the eighteenth century the crown established a standing military and with it, special privileges (fuero militar). The privilege extended to the military was the first fuero extended to the non-whites who served the crown. Indians had a form of corporate privilege through their membership in indigenous communities. In central Mexico, the crown established a special Indian court (Juzgado General de Indios), and legal fees, including access to lawyers, were funded by a special tax. The crown extended the peninsular institution of the merchant guild (consulado) first established in Spain, including Seville (1543), and later established in Mexico City and Peru. Consulado membership was dominated by peninsular-born Spaniards, usually members of transatlantic commercial houses. The consulados' tribunals heard disputes over contracts, bankruptcy, shipping, insurance and the like and became a wealthy and powerful economic institution and source of loans to the viceroyalties. Transatlantic trade remained in the hands of mercantile families based in Spain and the Indies. The men in the Indies were often younger relatives of the merchants in Spain, who often married wealthy American-born women. American-born Spanish men (criollos) in general did not pursue commerce but instead owned landed estates, entered the priesthood, or became a professional. Within elite families then peninsular-born Spaniards and criollos were often kin.

The regulation of the social system perpetuated the privileged status of wealthy elite spanish men against the vast indigenous populations, and the smaller but still significant number of mixed-race castas. In the Bourbon era, for the first time there was a distinction made between Iberian-born and American-born Spaniards, In the Habsburg era, in law and ordinary speech they were grouped together without distinction. Increasingly American-born Spaniards developed a distinctly local focus, with peninsular-born (peninsulares) Spaniards increasingly seen as outsiders and resented, but this was a development in the late colonial period. Resentment against peninsulares was due to a deliberate change in crown policy, which systematically favored them over American-born criollos for high positions in the civil and religious hierarchies. This left criollos only the membership in a city or town's cabildo. When the secularizing Bourbon monarchy pursued policies strengthening secular royal power over religious power, it attacked the fuero eclesiástico, which for many members of the lower clergy was a significant privilege. Parish priests who had functioned as royal officials as well as clerics in Indian towns lost their privileged position. At the same time the crown established a standing army and promoted militias for the defense of empire, creating a new avenue of privilege for creole men and for castas, but excluding indigenous men from conscription or voluntary service.

== See also ==
- Spanish American wars of independence

== Sources ==
- Altman, Ida; Cline, Sarah; Javier Pescador, Juan (2003). The Early History of Greater Mexico. Upper Saddle River, NJ: Pearson. pp. 321–322.
- Bedini, Silvio, ed. (1992). The Christopher Columbus Encyclopedia. Simon & Schuster. ISBN 978-0131426702.
- Bennassar, Bartolomé (2001). La América española y la América portuguesa: siglos XVI–XVIII (in Spanish). Akal. ISBN 978-8476002032.
- Brading, D.A. (1971). Miners and Merchants in Bourbon Mexico, 1763–1810. New York: Cambridge University. ISBN 978-0521102070.
- Brading, D.A. (1993). The First America: Spanish Monarchy, Creole Patriots, and the Liberal State, 1492–1866. Cambridge: Cambridge University Press. ISBN 978-0521447966.
- Burbank, Jane; Cooper, Frederick (2010). Empires in World History: Power and the Politics of Difference. Princeton University Press. pp. 120–121. ISBN 978-0691127088.
- Chipman, Donald E. (2005). Moctezuma's Children: Aztec Royalty under Spanish Rule, 1520–1700 (Individual e-book (no page numbers) ed.). Austin: University of Texas Press. ISBN 978-0292782648.
- Encyclopedia of Latin American History and Culture. New York: Charles Scribner's Sons. 1996. 5 volumes
- Gibson, Charles (1964). The Aztecs Under Spanish Rule. Stanford: Stanford University Press.
- Gibson, Charles (1966). Spain in America. New York: Harper and Row.
- Góngora, Mario (1998). Estudios sobre la historia colonial de hispanoamérica (in Spanish). Editorial Universitaria. ISBN 978-9561113817.
- Historia general de España y América (in Spanish). Vol. 10. Ediciones Rialp. 1992. ISBN 978-8432121029.
- Lagos Carmona, Guillermo (1985). Los títulos históricos (in Spanish). Editorial Andrés Bello. OCLC 320082537.
- Lockhart, James; Schwartz, Stuart B. (1983). Early Latin America. New York: Cambridge University Press. ISBN 978-0521233446.
- Mecham, J. Lloyd (1966). Church and State in Latin America: A History of Politico-Ecclesiastical Relations (revised ed.). Chapel Hill: University of North Carolina Press.
