= Colon statue =

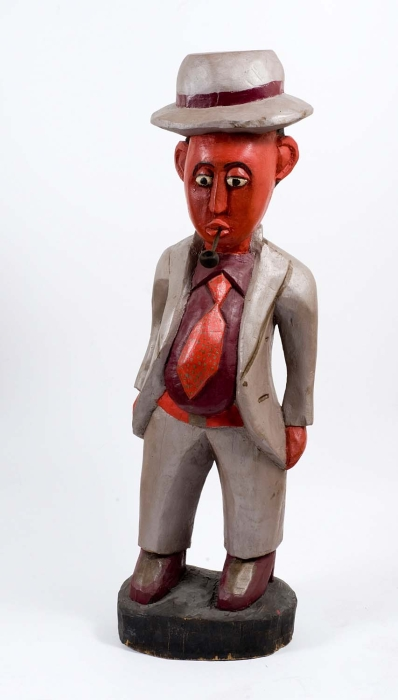
A typical colon statue in the collection of the Tropenmuseum

Colon statues, a term derived from the French statues colon ("colon" is the French noun for a colonist), are a genre of wooden figurative sculpture within African art which originated during the colonial period. The statues commonly depict European colonial officials such as civil servants, doctors, soldiers or technicians or Europeanised middle-class Africans. They are often characterised by recurrent decorative motifs, such as pith helmets, suits, official uniforms or tobacco pipes, and are painted in bright or glossy colours with vegetable-based paints.

As a genre, colon statues originated in West Africa, apparently among the Baoulé in Ivory Coast. It achieved international popularity after World War II and after decolonisation. It has been argued that the genre originated as an African response to colonisation and the repression at the hands of the colonial state. It is debated whether the statues were originally seen as satirical caricatures of colonial officials or simply depictions of new subjects in local styles. Whether the original statues were intended to be purely ornamental or also served a ritual function is also debated by anthropologists.

Among the notable artists who worked in the style was the Nigerian Thomas Ona Odulate (fl.1900-50) whose works are widely exhibited in museums in the United States and Europe.

Today, colon statues are widely produced as tourist souvenirs in West and Central Africa.

== Bibliography ==
- Glasman, Joel (2012). "La mémoire de l'uniforme. Langage policier et enjeu professionnel au Togo". In Goerg, O.; Pondopoulo, G. (eds.). Islam et sociétés en Afrique subsaharienne à l’épreuve de l’histoire. Un parcours en compagnie de Jean-Louis Triaud. Paris: Karthala.
- Steiner, Christopher B. (1994). African Art in Transit (2004 ed.). Cambridge: Cambridge University Press. pp. 148–50. ISBN 0521434475.
- Werewere, Liking (1987). Statues colons. Statuettes peintes d'Afrique de l'Ouest. Abidjan: Nouvelles Editions africaines. ISBN 2723614212.
