= Évolué =

Westernised élites in French and Belgian colonial empires

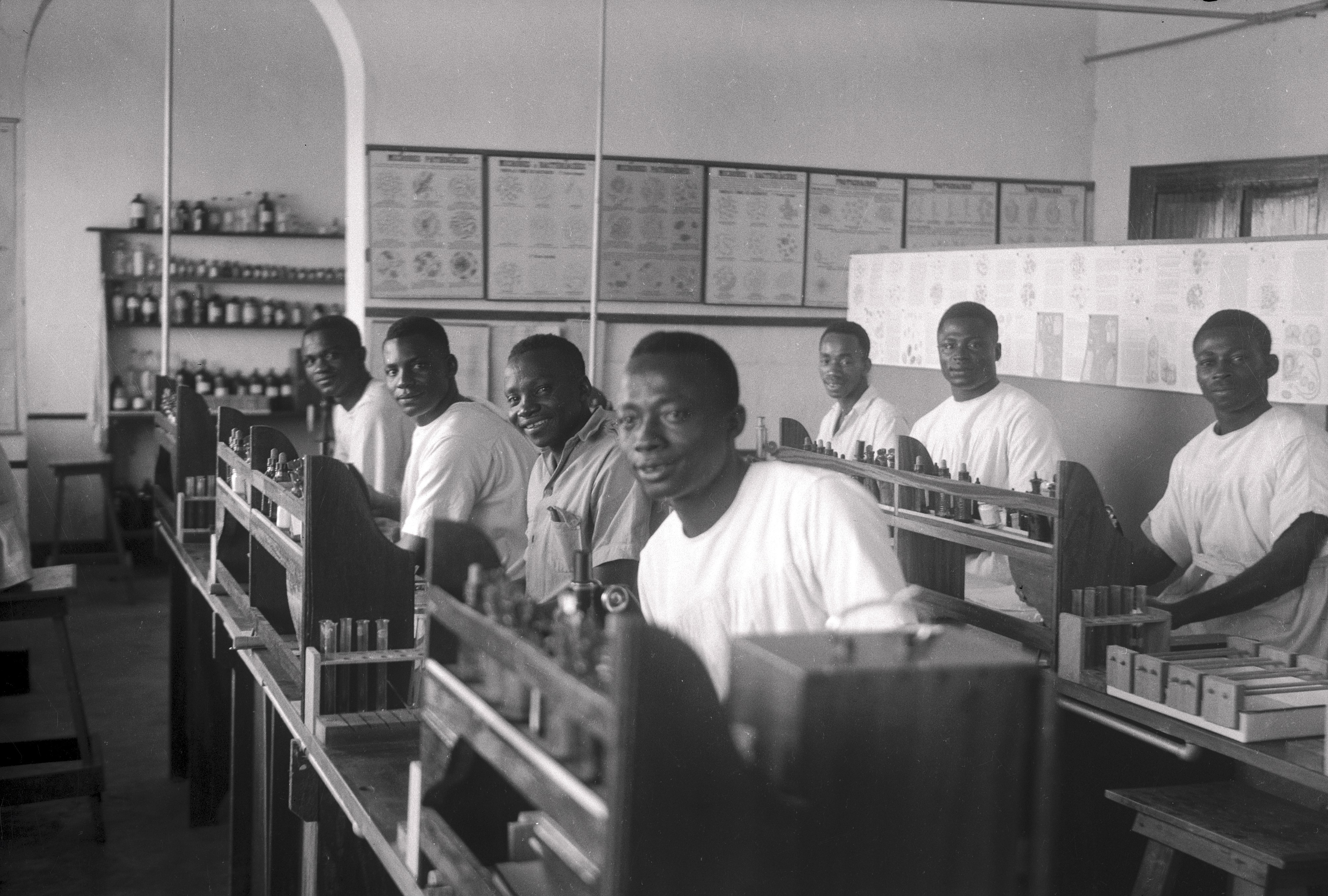
Évolués in the Belgian Congo studying medicine in Medical School of Yakusu Hospital, near Kisangani.

In the Belgian and French colonial empires, an évolué (French pronunciation: [evɔlɥe], lit. 'evolved one' or 'developed one') was an African who had been Europeanised through education and assimilation and had accepted European values and patterns of behaviour. Évolués spoke French and followed European rather than indigenous laws, usually held white-collar jobs (though rarely higher than clerks), and lived primarily in urban areas.

== Belgian colonies ==
In the Belgian Congo (modern-day Democratic Republic of the Congo), most évolués emerged from the Congolese who filled skilled positions (such as clerks and nurses) made available by the economic boom in the country following World War II. Colonial administrators defined an évolué as "a man having broken social ties with his group, [and] having entered another system of motivations, another system of values." While there were no universal criteria for determining évolué status, it was generally accepted that one would have "a good knowledge of French, adhere to Christianity, and have some form of post-primary education."

Early on in their history, most évolués sought to use their unique status to earn special privileges in the Congo. They asked that the colonial administration recognize their role as mediators between the Belgians and the native "savages." On 12 July 1948, the Governor-General of the Belgian Congo issued an ordinance creating the carte de mérite civique (civic merit card), which could be granted to any Congolese who had no criminal record, did not practice polygamy, abandoned traditional religion, and had some degree of education.

French literacy was required except for those persons who had served 20 years as a customary chief or who had provided "good and faithful service" for 25 years in the administration. Cardholders were given an improved legal status and were exempt from certain restrictions on travel into European districts. Of the thousands of évolués in the Congo, only a small proportion of them earned a carte. In 1957 there were 1,557 cardholders.

There was discontent about the limited nature of the privileges attached to the carte de mérite civique; so in 1952, the colonial administration introduced the carte d'immatriculation, which granted to those who obtained it full legal equality with Europeans. The latter card was much more difficult to obtain. One who sought to obtain it had to have a letter of recommendation from his employer and pass an evaluation. The evaluation was administered by an investigative commission, which would visit a candidate in his home, examine his household items such as linen and silverware, and ascertain if he ate with his wife at the table and communicated with his children in French. After this, a candidate and his wife had to appear before the head magistrate of the provincial court to answer a series of questions. By 1958 only 217 Congolese had been awarded a carte d'immatriculation. Most évolués found immatriculation irritating and by the mid-1950s, the project was thoroughly discredited.

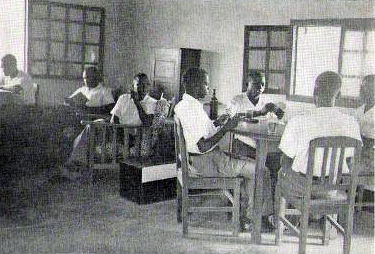
A social club in the Belgian Congo, c. 1943.

Since opportunities for upward social mobility through the colonial structure were limited, the évolué class institutionally manifested itself through clubs and associations. Through these groups they could enjoy trivial privileges that made them feel distinct from the Congolese "masses". In 1947, there were 110 social clubs consisting of 5,609 members throughout the Congo's cities. From 1952 to 1956, the number of clubs rose from 131 to 317, with their membership increasing from 7,661 to 15,345.

Most of these associations were rather small, but some eventually grew in size to encompass entire regions and ethnic groups, such as the Alliance des Bakongo. Évolués organised most of the educational opportunities for women in the Belgian Congo, since the colonial government put little effort into such ventures.

By 1958, colonial officials estimated that there were 175,000 people who could be classed as évolués in the colony. In the final years leading up to independence, évolués played a major role in colonial propaganda as they were felt to exemplify the success of the Belgian civilizing mission begun under King Leopold II. In particular, it was felt that after independence, the assimilation of European values by the évolués meant that Belgian civilian inhabitants of the Congo could continue to live in the Congo as part of a culturally European multiracial state.

Over time many évolués grew disillusioned with their attempts to assimilate with European culture, as it did not lead to full equality and the elimination of discrimination they sought. As this occurred, many became politically active and began pushing for Congolese independence from Belgium.

== French colonies ==
The évolué system was also present in French Africa. Well-known évolués include Léopold Sédar Senghor, the first president of Senegal, and Félix Houphouët-Boigny, who held multiple ministerial posts in France and later became the first president of Ivory Coast.

== See also ==
- Colon statue
- Assimilados
- Ilustrados
- Ladino people
- Affranchis
- Emancipados
- Model minority
- Authenticité (Zaire)
