= Emancipados =

Social-political demographic

Emancipado (Spanish pronunciation: [emanθiˈpaðo]) was a term used for an African-descended social-political demographic within the population of Spanish Guinea (modern day Equatorial Guinea) that existed in the early to mid 1900s. This segment of the native population had become assimilated into the former European society of Spanish Guinea which primarily existed along the coastline communities of the continental part of the country, as well as on the islands of Bioko and Annobón.

== Population specifics ==
This population included:

- Full-blooded descendants of local/regional native tribes that had assimilated to European culture after receiving a Christian Spanish education.
- Descendants of freed Cuban slaves who, despite being free to return to Cuba, remained in the country, marrying into the local population. These former slaves were brought to Africa by the Royal Orders of September 13, 1845 (by way of voluntary arrangement) and a June 20, 1861 deportation from Cuba, due to the lack of volunteers. Many were of European and/or Amerindian ancestry.
- Mulattoes born to Equatorial Guinean mothers and Spanish fathers, some unacknowledged by their fathers. Offspring resulting from unions of consent between African women and European men had become a social trend around the mid 1900s in Equatorial Guinea, as well as other parts of West Africa.

== See also ==
- Affranchis
- Saros
- Assimilados
- Bubi
- Edward Thaddeus Barleycorn Barber
- Évolués
- Fernandinos
- Ilustrados
- Ladino people
- Spanish Guinea
- Black Ladino
- Principalía
- Gente de razón
