= Affranchi =

Pejorative term used to refer to mulattoes

Regions with significant populations
- Saint-Domingue

Affranchi (/əˈfrɒ̃ʃi/, French: [afʁɑ̃ʃi]) is a former French legal term denoting a freedman or emancipated slave, but also a pejorative term for free people of color. The equivalent term in French for women is affranchie with a final "e" denoting the feminine grammatical gender. It is used in the English language to describe the social class of freedmen in Saint-Domingue, and other slave-holding French territories, who held legal rights intermediate between those of free whites and enslaved Africans. In Saint-Domingue, roughly half of the affranchis were gens de couleur libres (free people of color; Mulatto) and the other half African slaves.

== Etymology ==
The term is derived from the French word for emancipation—affranchissement, or enfranchisement in terms of political rights. But, the affranchis were barred from the franchise (voting) prior to a 1791 court case, which followed the French Revolution. The decision in their favor prompted a backlash from the French white planter class on Saint-Domingue, who also exerted power in France. These elements contributed to the outbreak of the Haitian Revolution.

== Effects ==
The affranchis had legal and social advantages over enslaved Africans. They became a distinct class in the society between whites and slaves. They could get some education, were able to own land, and could attend some French colonial entertainments. Planters who took slave women or free women of color as concubines, often sent their sons to France for education. In some cases these sons entered the French military. The parents were more likely to settle property on them as well. Because of such property and class issues, some free men of color considered themselves to have status above that of the petits blancs, shopkeepers and workers. Nonetheless, the latter had more political rights in the colony until after the Revolution.

The colonists passed so many restrictions that the affranchis were limited as a separate caste: they could not vote or hold colonial administrative posts, or work in professional careers as doctors or lawyers. There were sumptuary laws: the free people of color were forbidden to wear the style of clothes favored by the wealthy white colonists. In spite of the disadvantages, many educated affranchis identified culturally with France rather than with the enslaved population. A social class in between, the free people of color sometimes had tensions with both whites and enslaved Africans.

Ambitious mulattoes worked to gain acceptance from the white colonists who held power in that society. As they advanced in society, affranchis often also held land and slaves. Some acted as creditors for planters. One of their leaders in the late 18th century, Julien Raimond, an indigo planter, claimed that affranchis owned a third of all the slaves in the colony at that time. In the early years of the French Revolution and Haitian Revolution, many gens de couleur were committed to maintaining the institution of slavery. They wanted political equality based on class—that is, extended for men of property, regardless of skin color.

== See also ==
- Gens de couleur
- Emancipados
- Mulatto Haitian
- Assimilation (French colonialism)
