= Black ladino =

Spanish America Caste term

Black Ladinos (Spanish: negros ladinos) were Black Africans who had become acculturated to Spanish society, including through conversion to Christianity and knowledge of Spanish. Before the Spanish colonization of the Americas, Black people lived in the Iberian Peninsula both as free people and as people brought through the Arab slave trade and the Castilian and Portuguese colonization of Africa. By the 15th century, there were an estimated 50,000 Black Ladinos in Spain, most of them originating from the Upper Guinea region of West Africa.

During the early Spanish colonization of the Americas, enslaved Black people were brought from Spain to the colonies as a source of labour. Nicolás de Ovando promoted their importation after the decline of the Indigenous labour force, and between 1502 and 1518 Castile sent hundreds of Black slaves to the Americas, particularly for mining. Their enslavement was contested in part because of their Christian faith and because some escaped or joined Indigenous revolts.

== History ==
Prior to the arrival of Columbus to the Americas, there were Black people in the Iberian Peninsula who either lived as free men, or were brought through the Arab slave trade or the Castilian or Portuguese colonization of Africa. After some time in Spanish society, those Africans became Christianized and learned Spanish. There were 50,000 Black Ladinos in Spain in the 15th century. Although Black Ladinos came from many parts of the African continent, most had their origins in the Upper Guinea region, including modern day Senegal, Mali, Mauritania, and Guinea.

After the initial stages of the Spanish colonization of the Americas showed that Amerindians were not suitable for the labour that the conquerors required (mainly due to the Eurasian illnesses unknown in the Americas), Nicolás de Ovando decided to bring slaves from Spain. Between 1502 and 1518, Castile exiled hundreds of black slaves, primarily to work as miners. Opponents of their enslavement cited their Christian faith and their repeated attempts of escape to the mountains or to join the Native Americans in revolt. Proponents declared that the rapid diminution of the Native American population required a consistent supply of reliable low-cost workers. Free Spaniards were reluctant to do manual labor or to remain settled (especially after the discovery of gold on the mainland), and only slave labor assured the economic viability of the colonies.

== Examples ==
- Estevanico (c. 1500–1539), a Berber captured by the Portuguese and sold to a Spanish conquistador.
- The slaves in the schooner La Amistad were Mendes captured in Africa but were described as Ladinos by their Cuban buyers to avoid the ban on international slave trade.

== See also ==
- Afro-Spaniard: Current inhabitants of Spain of African descent.
- Emancipados: Black Spanish Guineans who enjoyed a special status by their Roman Catholic and Spanish education.
- Seasoning (colonialism)
- Ladino (disambiguation)
