= Pluricontinentalism =

Historical Portuguese colonial unity concept

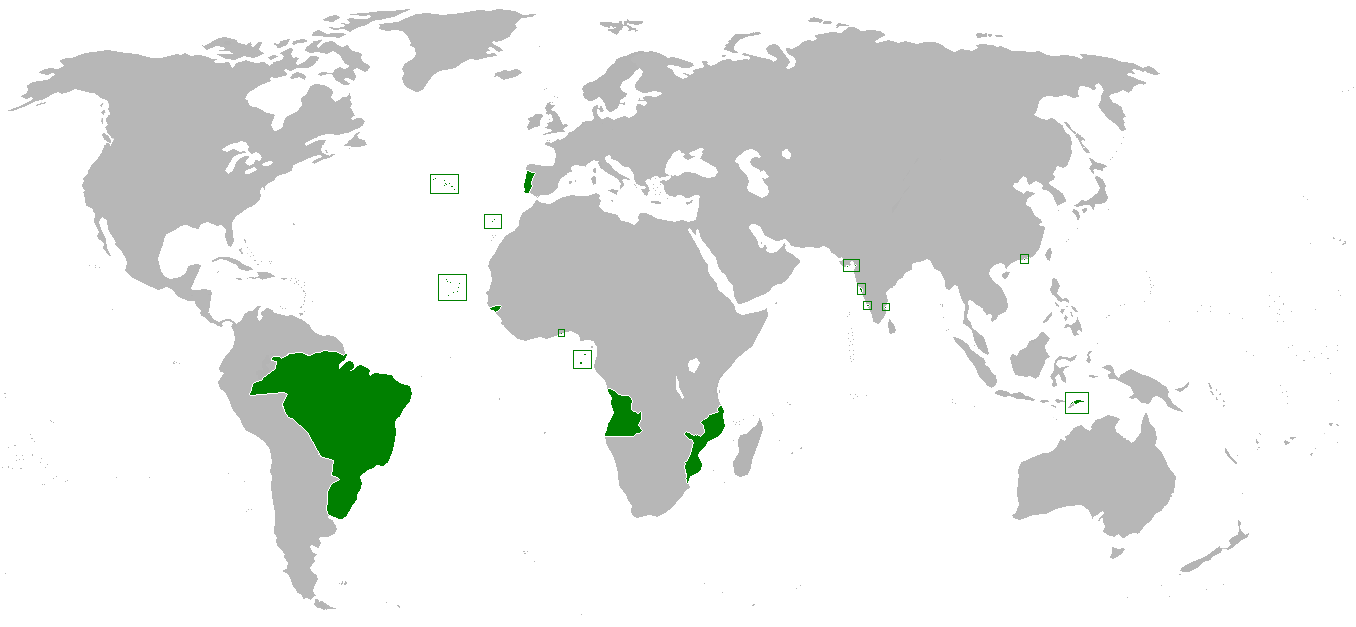
United Kingdom of Portugal, Brazil, and the Algarves and its colonies, 1800.

Pluricontinentalism (Portuguese: Pluricontinentalismo) was a geopolitical concept framing Portugal as a transcontinental country and a unitary nation-state made up of both continental Portugal and its overseas provinces. Tracing its roots to as early as the 14th century, pluricontinentalism was later promoted under the Estado Novo regime as a last attempt to justify retaining its remaining colonies. It presented Portugal not as a colonial empire but as a single nation-state spanning multiple continents, giving rise to the term.

== See also ==
- Atlanticism
- Eurasianism
- List of former transcontinental countries
- Luso-Africans
  - Assimilados
  - Lançados
  - Mestiços
  - Órfãs do Rei
  - Retornados
- Lusosphere
- Lusotropicalism
