= Assimilado =

Status granted to some Africans colonized by Portugal

Assimilado or assimilada (if female), literally "assimilated", was a status assigned from the 1910s to the 1960s to those African subjects of the colonial Portuguese Empire who had reached a level of "civilization", according to Portuguese legal standards, that theoretically qualified them for full rights as Portuguese citizens. Portuguese colonizers claimed the goal of their assimilation practices to be the "close union of races of different degrees of civilization that help and support each other loyally"; however, this notion of a "close union" differed from its practical application in the cultural and social spheres of the colonies of Portuguese Angola, Portuguese Mozambique and Portuguese Guinea.

== Formation in Portuguese lawmaking ==
=== Assimilation ideals begin ===
Portugal, along with France, was one of the only Africa colonizers which introduced the idea of assimilation of the colonized people into the population of the motherland. Although Portugal was one of the first European presences in Africa, Portuguese influence remained coastal and trade-oriented until the late 1800s, early 1900s; "control of the hinterland was non-existent, even in the 19th century", but with increased competition between European powers, the Portuguese "became more aggressively engaged", and adopted ideals of assimilation.

=== Laws and administration ===
Portuguese colonial laws had general and specific contexts for each of the colonies of Angola, Mozambique, and Portuguese Guinea; "some of the legislation and policies the Portuguese implemented reflected their empire-wide preoccupations, [while] others reflected their concerns specifically with the colony". In Angola, for instance, the procedure started with the applicant proving his ability to speak and write Portuguese. He then had to show that he had a source of income and pay a fee. The applicant also had to furnish a number of documents and certificates. The Organic Charter of Guinea enacted in 1917 also stipulated that the applicant must show proof of dedication to the interests of Portugal. In other African colonies, authorities required that natives live in a "European manner." One historical account even cited a covert surveillance system that monitored assimilated parents to ensure they did not teach their children any of the African languages.

The Department of Native Affairs, which was formed in 1914, had empire-wide effects; its purpose was 'to classify the African population into "civilized" or assimilated (assimilado), and "non-civilized" or nonassimilated (não-assimilado) to facilitate recruiting and to designate who were collaborators', which effectively initiated the legal category of assimilado throughout the colonial empire. Two laws, the Estatuto Politico, Civil, e Criminal dos indigenas das colónias de Angola, Guiné e Moçambique (Political, Criminal, and Civil Statute of the Natives of Angola, Guinea, and Mozambique) of 1926, which was revised as the Acto Colonial (Colonial Act) of 1930, and the Lei Orgânica do Ultramar (Organic Law of the Colonies) of 1954, explained the 'subordinate but vital role the colonies and colonial peoples were to play in the new Portuguese Empire, and the duty of the government towards the "native" populations'. The Portuguese colonial empire hoped that the assimilados would set an example for the rest of the Black Africans of the colonies to shift towards civilization; the Portuguese thus afforded some of the assimilados governmental roles, "as long as they were kept outside of 'anarchic democratic structures'."

=== Education and religion ===
Education and religion both were integral parts in the process of assimilation and the qualification for the status of assimilado. Beyond just the studying of Portuguese language and culture, the actual adoption of Portuguese culture as one's own, including the adoption of Christianity and the emulation of European and Portuguese ideals, was integral. Only through being Portuguese in every facet of life, from language to schooling to personal association, could one be considered a useful tool in society, and thus be afforded special rights.

=== Legal loopholes ===
Although the Portuguese conceded certain written rights to the assimilados, because of the authoritarian nature of the Portuguese government, "the status of 'assimilado' did not give these Africans explicit political rights". The Portuguese thus did not fear that assimilados would be "potential competitors" that might endanger "their predominant position". Since "the Portuguese colonial system could utilize more authoritarian instruments", the government could give assimilados jobs in the government, thus affording a small amount of protection to the assimilados, and proving to the international world the accommodating nature of their colonial rule, while not having to feel threatened by the educated assimilados in administrative jobs.

== Motivations for assimilation ==
=== Lusotropicalism and a "civilizing mission" ===
The Portuguese were certainly not the only colonizing power to stress a "civilizing mission" (missão civilizadora) as the central tenet of colonial expansion; the Portuguese elite, alongside many in power in most of the colonizer countries, believed that their country's "presence was a means to advance 'primitive peoples', to bring them knowledge and some kind of protection and welfare". However, the additional notion of assimilation adds a specific element to the motivations of Portugal's colonizing government. The notion of lusotropicalism, which posited a "multicultural image (lusotropicalismo), with its emphasis on the mutuality and intermingling of African, Afro-Portuguese (creole), and Portuguese institutions" was introduced as New State propaganda displaying the ideal Portuguese colonialism, but the reality of Portugal's colonial institutions lay far from that ideal.

=== Reality ===
In this perspective, Portuguese rhetoric, which stressed the luso-tropical myth of a particular affinity to non-European cultures, including the emergence of mestiço populations and an easy way to assimilation, appears as pure and voluntary hypocrisy. The myth would have been created to hide the abuses inherent in the colonial system.

The myth originated during the Salazar regime, paralleling the motivations of the Catholic Church, to entrench the empire in colonial Africa. Despite the "white man's burden" of civilizing and educating the Africans under its colonial rule, over the span of its five centuries of presence and influence in Africa, the Portuguese colonial government failed to train even one African doctor in Mozambique, and its two other colonies fared just as poorly, as low life expectancies can demonstrate.

== View/treatment by Portuguese over time ==
=== African "inferiority" ===
It became clear that, although promoting the ideal of lusotropicalism to the world, Portugal viewed African superstition and magical practices as proof that the African culture and African mind was inferior, and thus should not truly be integrated into the Portuguese way of life and governance; thus, the Portuguese strove to limit the education and assimilation of Africans. The Portuguese also saw this inferiority as irreversible and inevitable, claiming that unlike Portugal, Africa has only just begun its journey towards "civilization". Thus, Africans were supposedly not going to abandon their superstitions and be fit for the consideration of assimilation, further proving the hypocrisy of the Portuguese colonial government and its empty propaganda.

=== Restrictions on obtaining assimilado status ===
With increased time spent in the colonies, Portugal made it increasingly more difficult for the status of assimilado to be reached; after the Second World War in colonial Angola, the New State, the Portuguese regime, decided to alter the requirements necessary for the acquisition of assimilado status, making it more difficult to do so, and thus minimizing actual African presence in government and society; for example, in the Colonial Statute of 1954, in order to be considered for assimilado status, one needed to "have a Catholic baptismal certificate, obtain a civil marriage license, secure a Portuguese sponsor, be employed in a "civilized" job, and live like a Portuguese. By 1958 the entire process cost $100 (U.S.)," effectively making it near to impossible for such a status to be reached.

Due to the extremely rigid requirements, obtaining Portuguese citizenship proved to be so difficult that by 1958, there were only 30,089 assimilados out of the 4,392,000 total population of Angola. The number was smaller in Mozambique, which had 4,353 assimilados in the same period out of its 6,234,000 total population.

=== Restrictions once assimilated ===
For those very few Africans who were able to gain assimilado status, it can be argued whether or not their lives were improved in any appreciable amount; assimilados did not gain cultural integration into Portuguese society, and even with their education and increased status, their white, Portuguese counterparts in the colonies had full rights. Using the example of the Ovimbundu Protestant assimilados as proof, assimilados in the colonies were not given any appreciable amount of cultural, social or political equality:

In [areas with increased settler populations], Ovimbundu Protestant assimilados faced residential discrimination, were unable to compete for places in government and privately run schools, and rarely had opportunities to socialize with whites and Afro-Portuguese in the private and public clubs, theaters, beaches, and other places that catered to the "civilized" population. Like the masses of Angola's "uncivilized" Africans, they resided in the slums (musseques) with none of the access to the public services which their taxes were supposed to provide.

While assimilated citizens did have access to the benefits of the Portuguese law, they were not granted a position of equality with white Portuguese. Aside from discrimination, an assimilado had to carry an identity card proving his citizenship. This prompted Eduardo Mondlane, the late leader of Mozambique Liberation Front, to describe the assimilado system as nothing but a mechanism to create a few "honorary whites."

== Cultural identity ==
Due to their assumption of Portuguese culture while being subject to non-Portuguese influence from their native African societies that they lived in, it is undoubted that assimilados faced difficulty in defining their cultural identity. Oftentimes, assimilados were left devoid of true culture – for they were never truly accepted into Portuguese society, and with the abandonment of African ideals, were ostracized from African society. Occasionally, assimilados held on to the customs and traditions followed by their non-assimilated counterparts. However, there were many assimilados who "defined themselves as 'educated Black Portuguese' and nothing more". With the start of the revolution for independence, this debate of identity and loyalty of the assimilados came seriously into play, and many times, the locally run, African-based revolutionary groups attacked the notion of assimilados and viewed them as traitors to the cause of national liberation.

== In the fight for independence ==
Assimilated and educated Africans played an important role in the fight for liberation, but since UNITA and UPA were both local-run, unity was hard to achieve; "the indications Mabeko Tali gives us for the East of Angola, where the MPLA armed front split in two because of incompatible attitudes between a local leadership and intellectual radicals, suggest that major gaps existed between 'educated militants' and the peasants of the Angolan interior".

As educated Africans present during the time of revolution against the Portuguese regime, it can be assumed that assimilados would inevitably play a role in the struggle for liberation; however, the important role of the assimilado was possibly one more of internal fission and weakening of the anti-colonial resistance movement, than one of unified fight for independence against a dictatorial regime. Although there was a relatively large portion of assimilados that did not fight on the side of Africans in the struggle for liberation, the presence and contributions of assimilados were integral, especially in the formation of the MPLA, which was formed from the amalgamation of an assimilado group with organizations of cultural nationalists and anti-government forces including the communist party of Angola.

== See also ==
- Black Ladinos
- Emancipados
- Évolués
- French colonial Assimilation
- Ilustrados
- Lusosphere
- Lusotropicalism
- Pluricontinentalism
- White man's burden
- Luso-Africans
  - Lançados
  - Mestiços
  - Órfãs do Rei
  - Retornados
  - Degredados
