= Degredado =

Portuguese term for an exiled convict

Degredado is the traditional Portuguese term for an exiled convict, especially between the 15th and 18th centuries.

The term degredado (etymologically, a 'decreed one', from Latin decretum) is a traditional Portuguese legal term used to refer to anyone who was subject to legal restrictions on their movement, speech or labor. Exile is only one of several forms of legal impairment. But with the development of the Portuguese penal transportation system, the term degredado became synonymous with convict exiles, and exile itself referred to as degredo.

== Background ==
Most degredados were common criminals, although many were political or religious prisoners (e.g. 'backsliding' New Christians), who had been sentenced to be exiled from the Kingdom of Portugal. The sentence was not always direct - many had been given long sentences of imprisonment (sometimes death), but took the option to have their sentences commuted to a shorter period of exile overseas, in service of the crown.

Degredados played an important role in the era of Portuguese discoveries and were of outsized importance in the establishment of Portuguese colonies overseas, particularly in Africa and Brazil.

Eventually, most degredados would be dropped off at a colony or (especially in the early years) abandoned on an unfamiliar shore, where they would remain for the duration of their sentence. Many were given specific instructions on behalf of the crown, and if they fulfilled them well, might earn them commutation or pardon. Common instructions included helping establish staging posts and warehouses, serving as laborers in a new colony, or garrisoning a fledgling fort. Degradados abandoned on unfamiliar shores (known as lançados, literally 'the launched ones') were often instructed to conduct exploratory work inland, searching for rumored cities, making contact with unknown peoples. Some degredados achieved a measure of fame as inland explorers, making their name almost as famous to posterity as that of the great discoverer captains themselves (e.g. António Fernandes).

While many degredados performed well enough to have their sentences reduced or pardoned as a reward, probably as many just ignored the terms of their exile. Some jumped ship along the way, usually at a relatively safe port, rather than allowing themselves to be dropped off at some distant and dangerous shore. Others sneaked onto ships returning to Portugal (or some other European country) at their first chance. Some went off and formed 'outlaw' degredado colonies, away from the supervisory eye of crown officials. Others 'went native', building up a new life of their own among the local inhabitants, obliterating their past altogether (e.g. the 'Bachelor of Cananeia')

== History ==
In the early years of Portuguese discoveries and empire-building in the 15th and 16th centuries, outbound ships usually carried a small number of degredados, to assist in tasks deemed too hazardous or onerous for ordinary crewmen; e.g. upon reaching an unfamiliar shore, a degredado or two were usually landed first to test if the native inhabitants were hostile. After opening contact was made, degredados were often assigned to spend the nights in the native town or village (while the rest of the crew slept aboard ships), to build up trust and collect information. If relations turned hostile, it was degredados who were charged with the dangerous job of carrying negotiating terms between the ships and local rulers.

In the 16th and 17th centuries, degredados formed a substantial portion of early colonists in Portuguese Empire. The Moroccan enclaves, the Atlantic islands, Portuguese São Tomé and Príncipe and more distant African colonies such as Portuguese Angola, Benguela and Portuguese Mozambique, were built up and significantly (if not mostly) populated by degredados. Many of the original Brazilian colonies were also founded with degradado colonists, e.g. Vasco Fernandes Coutinho carried some 70 degredados to found Espírito Santo in 1536; royal governor Tomé de Sousa carried an estimated 400-600 degredados to establish Salvador, the original capital of Portuguese Brazil, in 1549.

== Famous degredados ==
- João Nunes a New Christian degredado taken by Vasco da Gama on the first expedition to India. On account of his rudimentary knowledge of Hebrew and Arabic, Nunes was the first to go ashore in Calicut, India, and it is Nunes (not Gama) who uttered the famous phrase "We came to seek Christians and spices".
- Luís de Moura, a degredado taken by Pedro Álvares Cabral on the second armada (1500). Dropped off in East Africa, Moura would serve for many years as the effective Portuguese factor and representative to the Sultan of Malindi, an important Portuguese ally in East Africa.
- António Fernandes - a sometime carpenter who had been exiled to Sofala in either 1500 or 1505; Fernandes went on to conduct a series of overland exploration trips in 1512–1515, 300 miles deep into the lands of the Monomatapa and Matabeleland.
- 'Bachelor of Cananeia' (Bacherel de Cananéia), a mysterious New Christian degredado known simply as 'the Bachelor' Abandoned on the coast of southern Brazil in 1502, he went on to raise himself into a major chieftain of the Carijó Indians around Cananeia. In 1533, the 'Bachelor' famously led a raid to sack and destroy the Portuguese colony of São Vicente.
- João Ramalho was either a degredado or a shipwrecked sailor (uncertain which), who was left in southern Brazil c. 1511. Ramalho established himself as a lesser chieftain among the Tupiniquim of the Piratininga plateau. Unlike the hostile Bachelor, Ramalho helped the Portuguese establish themselves at São Vicente (1532) and later São Paulo (c. 1550)

== See also ==
- Assimilados
- Lançados
- Luso-Africans
- Lusotropicalismo
- Mestiço
- Órfãs d'El-Rei
- Prazeros
- Retornados
- Signares
- Bandeirantes

== Sources ==
- Coates, T.J. (2001) Convicts and orphans: forced and state-sponsored colonizers in the Portuguese Empire, 1550-1755, Stanford University Press.
- Diffie, B. W., and G. D. Winius (1977) Foundations of the Portuguese empire, 1415–1580, Minneapolis, MN: University of Minnesota Press
- Russell-Wood, A.J.R. (1998) The Portuguese Empire 1415–1808: A world on the move. Baltimore, MD: Johns Hopkins University Press.
- Subrahmanyam, S. (1997) The Career and Legend of Vasco da Gama. Cambridge, UK: Cambridge University Press.
