= Creole peoples =

Ethnic groups formed from mixed cultural and linguistic ancestry

Creole peoples may refer to various ethnic groups around the world. The term's meaning exhibits regional variations, often sparking debate.

Creole peoples represent a diverse array of ethnicities, each possessing a distinct cultural identity that has been shaped over time. The emergence of creole languages, frequently associated with Creole ethnicity, is a separate phenomenon.

In specific historical contexts, particularly during the European colonial era, the term Creole applies to ethnicities formed through large-scale population movements. These movements involved people from diverse linguistic and cultural backgrounds who converged upon newly established colonial territories. Often involuntarily separated from their ancestral homelands, these populations were forced to adapt and create a new way of life. Through a process of cultural amalgamation, they selectively adopted and merged desirable elements from their varied heritages. This resulted in the emergence of novel social norms, languages, and cultural practices that transcended their individual origins.

This process of cultural amalgamation, termed creolization, is characterized by rapid social change that ultimately lead to the formation of a distinct Creole identity.

== Etymology and overview ==
The English word creole derives from the French créole, which in turn came from Portuguese crioulo, a diminutive of cria meaning a person raised in one's house. Cria is derived from criar, meaning "to raise or bring up", itself derived from the Latin creare, meaning "to make, bring forth, produce, beget"; which is also the source of the English word "create". It originally referred to the descendants of European colonists who had been born in the colony. Creole is also known by cognates in other languages, such as crioulo, criollo, creolo, kriolu, criol, kreyol, kreol, kriol, krio, and kriyoyo.

In Louisiana, the term Creole has been used since 1792 to represent descendants of African or mixed heritage parents as well as children of French and Spanish descent with no racial mixing. Its use as in the name for languages started from 1879, while as an adjective for languages, its use began around 1748.

In Spanish-speaking countries, the word Criollo refers to the descendants of Europeans born in the Americas, but also in some countries, to describe something local or very typical of a particular Latin American region.

In the Caribbean, the term broadly refers to all the people, whatever their class or ancestry — African, East Asian, European, Indian — who are part of the culture of the Caribbean. In Trinidad, the term Creole is used to designate all Trinidadians except those of Asian origin. In Suriname, the term refers only to the descendants of enslaved Africans and in neighboring French Guiana the term refers to anyone, regardless of skin colour, who has adopted a European lifestyle.

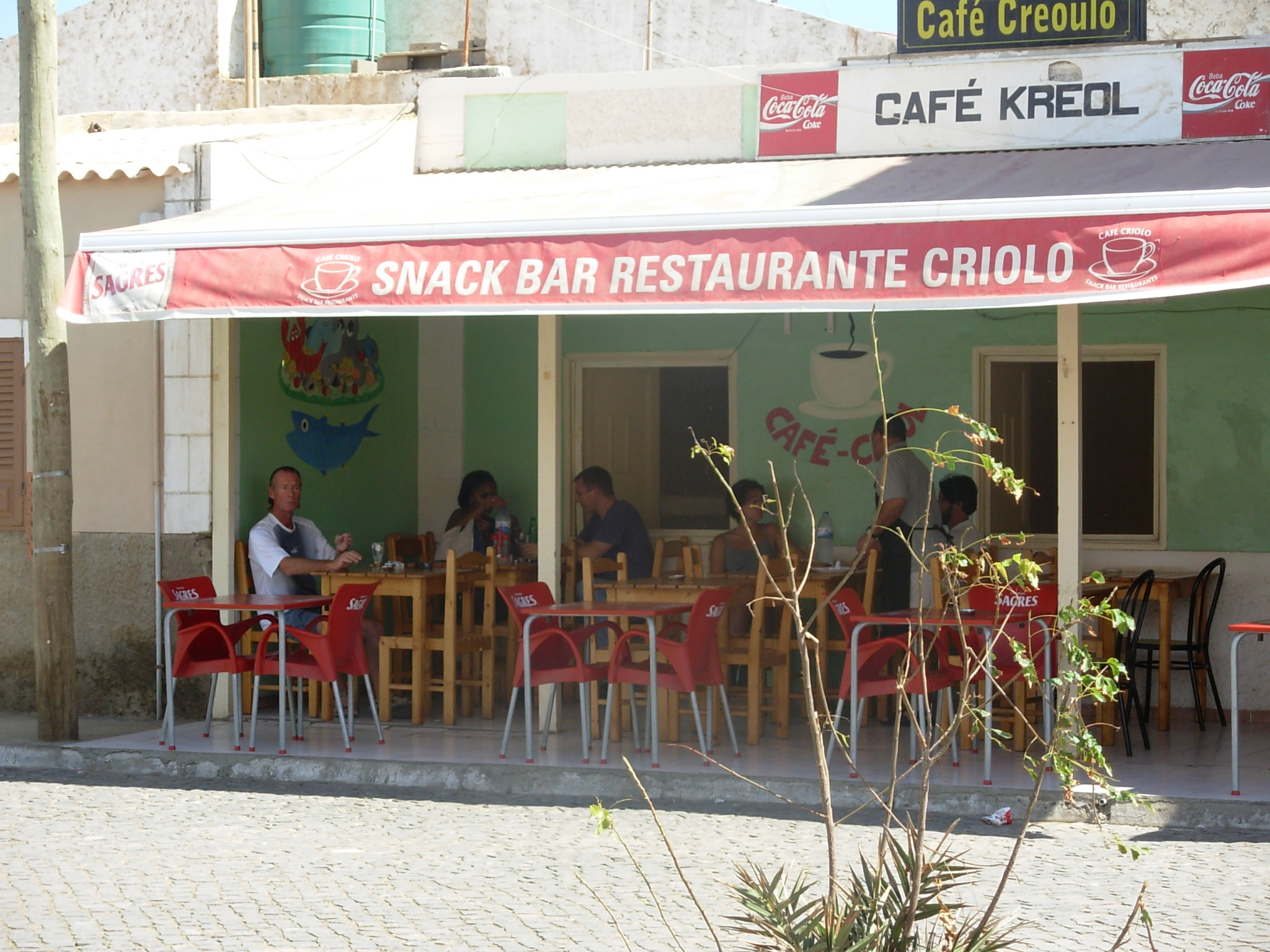
Trilingual signs on Cafe Kreol in Cape Verde.

In Africa, the term Creole refers to any ethnic group formed during the European colonial era, with some mix of African and non-African racial or cultural heritage. Creole communities are found on most African islands and along the continent's coastal regions where indigenous people first interacted with Europeans. As a result of these contacts, five major Creole types emerged in: Portuguese, African American, Dutch, French and British.

The Crioulos of African or mixed Portuguese and descent eventually gave rise to several ethnic groups in Cape Verde, Guinea-Bissau, São Tomé e Príncipe, Angola and Mozambique. The French-speaking Mauritian and Seychellois Creoles are both either African or ethnically mixed and Christianized. On Réunion, the term Creole applies to all people born on the island, while in South Africa, the blending of East African and Southeast Asian slaves with Dutch settlers, later produced a creolized population. The Fernandino Creole peoples of Equatorial Guinea are a mix of Cubans with Emancipados and English-speaking Liberated Africans, while the Americo-Liberians and Sierra Leone Creoles resulted from the intermingling of African Recaptives with Caribbean people and African Americans.

Perhaps due to the range of divergent descriptions and lack of a coherent definition, Norwegian anthropologist T. H. Eriksen concludes:

“A Creole society, in my understanding, is based wholly or partly on the mass displacement of people who were, often involuntarily, uprooted from their original home, shedding the main features of their social and political organisations on the way, brought into sustained contact with people from other linguistic and cultural areas and obliged to develop, in creative and improvisational ways, new social and cultural forms in the new land, drawing simultaneously on traditions from their respective places of origin and on impulses resulting from the encounter.”

— Thomas Hylland Eriksen, Creolisation as a Recipe for Conviviality (2020)

The following ethnic groups have been historically characterized as "Creole" peoples:

- Afro-Brazilian Crioulos
- Aku Krio people
- Atlantic Creoles
- Belizean Kriol people
- Cape Verdeans (Crioulos)
- Criollo people (European diaspora born in the Spanish colonies in the Americas)
- Fernandino Creole peoples
- Haitian Creole peoples
  - Saint-Domingue Creoles
  - Affranchis
- Honduran#Creole Honduran Creoles
- Liberian Creole people
- Alabama Creoles
- Arkansas Creoles
- Louisiana Creole people
  - Creoles of color
- Missouri French (Illinois Country Creoles)
- Mauritian Creole people
  - also Réunion Creole
- Seychellois Creole people
- Sierra Leone Creole people
- Surinamese Creole people

== United States ==
=== Alaska ===
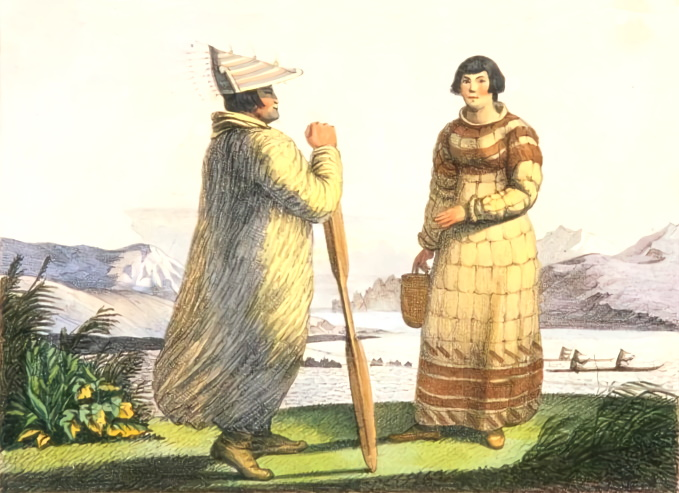
An Aleutian man with an Alaskan Creole woman in the Aleutian Islands.

Alaskan Creole, sometimes colloquially spelled "Kriol" in English (from Russian креол), are a unique people who first came about through the intermingling of Sibero-Russian promyshlenniki men with Aleut and Inuit women in the late 18th century and assumed a prominent position in the economy of Russian America and the North Pacific Rim.

=== Arkansas ===
Arkansas Creoles French roots run deep in Arkansas. It was in Arkansas, near the original site of Arkansas Post, in the late seventeenth century, that Sieur de la Salle established what he imagined would be the center of French empire in North America. What actually emerged, did indeed encompass Arkansas: a vast arc of French forts and settlements, linking the Gulf of Mexico to the Great Lakes and beyond, the Northern Atlantic and France itself. French officials hoped this network of settlements and trading posts would serve as a bulwark against the expanding British settlements to the east and those of the Spanish to the south and west.

French ambitions in North America within historic French Louisiana came to a grinding halt with their loss to Great Britain in the Seven Years’ War, and although the Spanish takeover of the territory known as la Louisiane preserved many existing cultural, religious, and legal norms, most of the remaining Francophone communities disappeared after the 1803 purchase of the Louisiana Territory by the United States opened the door to rapid Anglo-American settlement.

But Creole culture in Arkansas persisted. French-speaking hunters and settlers, many of mixed European and Indigenous ancestry, some enslaved or formerly enslaved people of African descent, continued to live and work in this region. New French-speakers continued to arrive as well, albeit in comparatively small numbers, even after Arkansas’s acquisition by the United States and annexation as a territory in 1819.

=== Chesapeake Colonies ===
Atlantic Creole is a term coined by historian Ira Berlin to describe a group of people from Angola and Central Africa in the 16th and 17th centuries with cultural or ethnic ties to Africa, Europe, and sometimes the Caribbean. Some of these people arrived in the Chesapeake Colonies as the Charter Generation of slaves during the European colonization of the Americas before 1660. Some had lived and worked in Europe or the Caribbean before coming (or being transported) to North America. Examples of such men included John Punch and Emanuel Driggus (his surname was likely derived from Rodrigues). Also, during the early settlement of the colonies, children born of immigrants in the colonies were often referred to as "Creole". This is found more often in the Chesapeake Colonies.

=== Louisiana ===
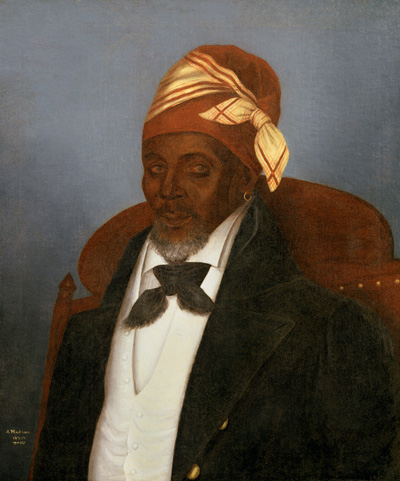
A Creole of New Orleans

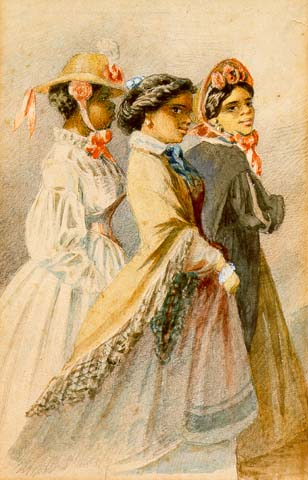
Bourgeois Louisiana Creole girls in fashionable dress

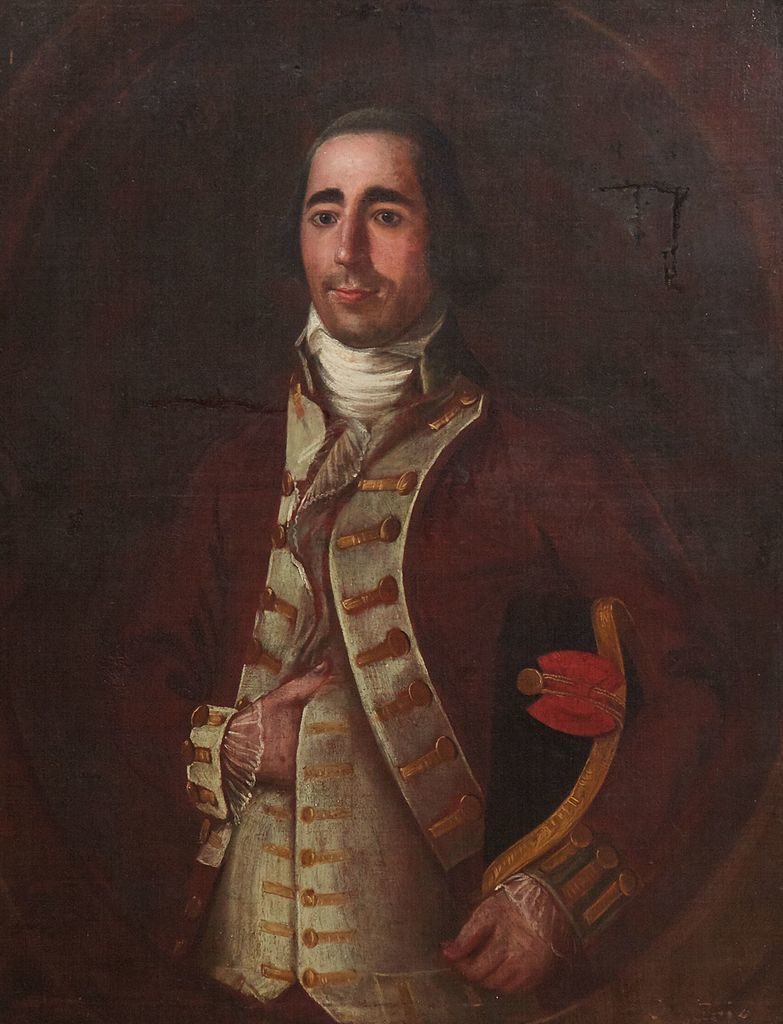
New Orleans Creole Matias Alpuente

In the United States, the words "Louisiana Creole" refers to people of any race or mixture thereof who are descended from colonial French La Louisiane and colonial Spanish Louisiana (New Spain) settlers before the Louisiana region became part of the United States in 1803 with the Louisiana Purchase. Both the word and the ethnic group derive from a similar usage, beginning in the Caribbean in the 16th century, which distinguished people born in the French, Spanish, and Portuguese colonies from the various new arrivals born in their respective, non-Caribbean homelands. Some writers from other parts of the country have mistakenly assumed the term to refer only to people of mixed racial descent, but this is not the traditional Louisiana usage.

In Louisiana, the term "Creole" was first used to describe people born in Louisiana, who used the term to distinguish themselves from newly arrived immigrants. It was not a racial or ethnic identifier; it was simply synonymous with "born in the New World," meant to separate native-born people of any ethnic background—white, African, or any mixture thereof—from European immigrants and slaves imported from Africa. Later, the term was racialized after newly arrived Anglo-Americans began to associate créolité, or the quality of being Creole, with racially mixed ancestry. This caused many white Creoles to eventually abandon the label out of fear that the term would lead mainstream Americans to believe them to be of racially mixed descent (and thus endanger their livelihoods or social standing). Later writers occasionally make distinctions among French Creoles (of European ancestry), Creoles of Color (of mixed ethnic ancestry), and occasionally, African Creoles (of primarily African descendant); these categories, however, are later inventions, and most primary documents from the eighteenth, nineteenth and early twentieth centuries make use of the word "Creole" without any additional qualifier. Creoles of Spanish and German descent also exist, and Spanish Creoles survive today as Isleños and Malagueños, both found in southern Louisiana. However, all racial categories of Creoles - from Caucasian, mixed racial, African, to Native American - tended to think and refer to themselves solely as Creole, a commonality in many other Francophone and Iberoamerican cultures, who tend to lack strict racial separations common in United States History and other countries with large populations from Northern Europe's various cultures. This racial neutrality persists to the modern day, as many Creoles do not use race as a factor for being a part of the ethno-culture.

Contemporary usage has again broadened the meaning of Louisiana Creoles to describe a broad cultural group of people of all races who share a colonial Louisianian background. Louisianians who identify themselves as "Creole" are most commonly from historically Francophone and Hispanic communities. Some of their ancestors came to Louisiana directly from France, Spain, or Germany, while others came via the French and Spanish colonies in the Caribbean and Canada. Many Louisiana Creole families arrived in Louisiana from Saint-Domingue as refugees from the Haitian Revolution, along with other immigrants from Caribbean colonial centers like Santo Domingo and Havana. The children of slaves brought primarily from Western Africa were also considered Creoles, as were children born of unions between Native Americans and non-Natives. Creole culture in Louisiana thus consists of a unique blend of European, Native American, and African cultures.

Louisianians descended from the French Acadians of Canada are also Creoles in a strict sense, and there are many historical examples of people of full European ancestry and with Acadian surnames, such as the influential Alexandre and Alfred Mouton, being explicitly described as "Creoles." Today, however, the descendants of the Acadians are more commonly referred to as, and identify as, 'Cajuns'—a derivation of the word Acadian, indicating French Canadian settlers as ancestors. The distinction between "Cajuns" and "Creoles" is stronger today than it was in the past because American racial ideologies have strongly influenced the meaning of the word "Creole" to the extent that there is no longer unanimous agreement among Louisianians on the word's precise definition. Today, many assume that any francophone person of European descent is Cajun and any francophone of African descent is Creole—a false assumption that would not have been recognized in the nineteenth century. Some assert that "Creole" refers to aristocratic urbanites whereas "Cajuns" are agrarian members of the francophone working class, but this is another relatively recent distinction. Creoles may be of any race and live in any area, rural or urban. The Creole culture of Southwest Louisiana is thus more similar to the culture dominant in Acadiana than it is to the Creole culture of New Orleans. Though the land areas overlap around New Orleans and down river, Cajun/Creole culture and language extend westward all along the southern coast of Louisiana, concentrating in areas southwest of New Orleans around Lafayette, and as far as Crowley, Abbeville, and into the rice belt of Louisiana nearer Lake Charles and the Texas border.

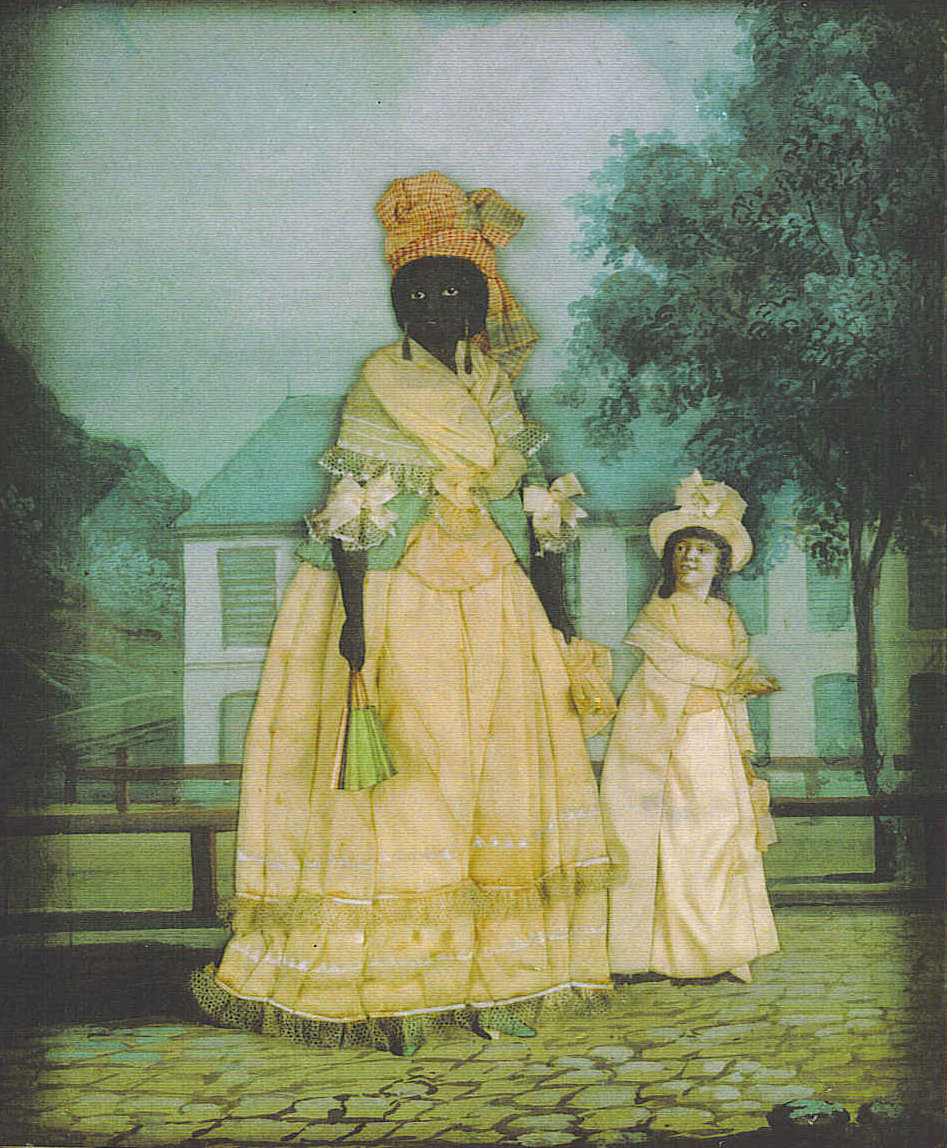
Free woman of color with mixed-race daughter; late 18th-century collage painting, New Orleans

Louisiana Creoles historically spoke a variety of languages; today, the most prominent include Louisiana French and Louisiana Creole. (There is a distinction between "Creole" people and the "creole" language. Not all Creoles speak creole—many speak French, Spanish, or English as primary languages.) Spoken creole is dying with continued 'Americanization' in the area. Most remaining Creole lexemes have drifted into popular culture. Traditional creole is spoken among those families determined to keep the language alive or in regions below New Orleans around St. James and St. John Parishes where German immigrants originally settled (also known as 'the German Coast', or La Côte des Allemands) and cultivated the land, keeping the ill-equipped French Colonists from starvation during the Colonial Period and adopting commonly spoken French and creole (arriving with the exiles) as a language of trade.

Creoles are largely Roman Catholic and influenced by traditional French and Spanish culture left from the first Colonial Period, officially beginning in 1722 with the arrival of the Ursuline Nuns, who were preceded by another order, the sisters of the Sacred Heart, with whom they lived until their first convent could be built with monies from the French Crown. (Both orders still educate girls in 2010). The "fiery Latin temperament" described by early scholars on New Orleans culture made sweeping generalizations to accommodate Creoles of Spanish heritage as well as the original French. The mixed-race Creoles, descendants of mixing of European colonists, slaves, and Native Americans or sometimes Gens de Couleur (free men and women of colour), first appeared during the colonial periods with the arrival of slave populations. Most Creoles, regardless of race, generally consider themselves to share a collective culture. Non-Louisianans often fail to appreciate this and assume that all Creoles are of mixed race, which is historically inaccurate.

Louisiane Creoles were also referred to as criollos, a word from the Spanish language meaning "created" and used in the post-French governance period to distinguish the two groups of New Orleans area and down river Creoles. Both mixed race and European Creole groups share many traditions and language, but their socio-economic roots differed in the original period of Louisiana history. Actually, the French word Créole is derived from the Portuguese word Crioulo, which described people born in the Americas as opposed to Spain.

The term is often used to mean simply "pertaining to the New Orleans area," but this, too, is not historically accurate. People all across the Louisiana territory, including the pays des Illinois, identified as Creoles, as evidenced by the continued existence of the term Créole in the critically endangered Missouri French.

=== Mississippi ===
The Mississippi Gulf Coast region has a significant population of Creoles—especially in Pass Christian, Bay St. Louis Natchez Moss Point Gulfport, Biloxi, and Pascagoula. A community known as Creoletown is located in Pascagoula, with its history on record. Many in this location are Catholic and have also used the Creole, French, and English languages.

=== Texas ===
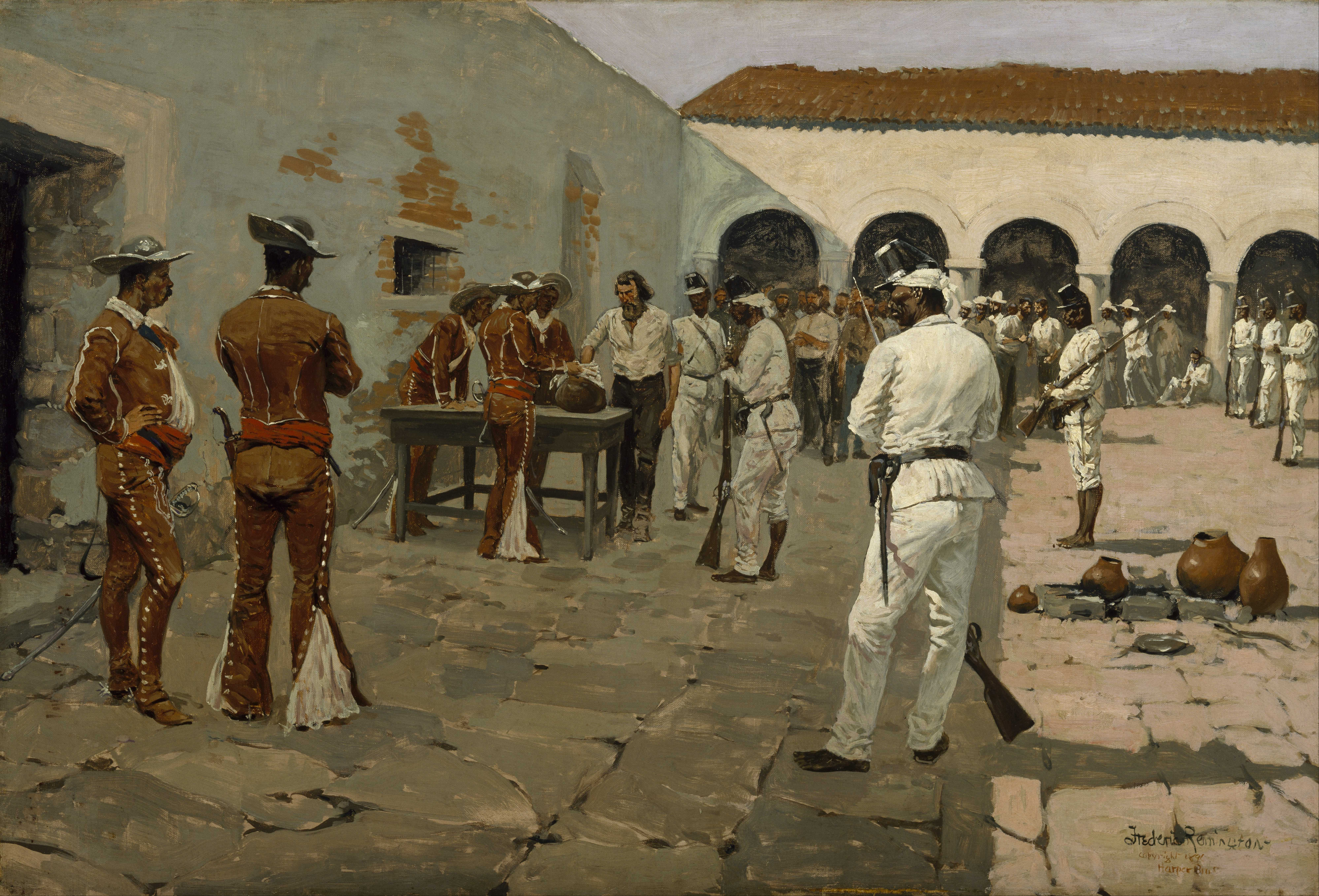
Spanish Creoles from Texas

In colonial Texas, the term "Creole" (criollo) distinguished old-world Africans and Europeans from their descendants born in the new world, Creoles; they composed the citizen class of New Spain's Tejas province.

Texas Creole culture revolved around "'ranchos" (Creole ranches), attended mostly by vaqueros (cowboys) of African, Spaniard, or Mestizo descent, and Tlaxcalan Nahuatl settlers, who established a number of settlements in southeastern Texas and western Louisiana (e.g. Los Adaes).

Black Texas Creoles have been present in Texas ever since the 1600s; they served as soldiers in Spanish garrisons of eastern Texas. Generations of Black Texas Creoles, also known as "Black Tejanos", played a role in later phases of Texas history: Mexican Texas, Republic of Texas, and American Texas.

== Africa ==
=== Southern Africa ===
Unlike the Americas, the term coloured is preferred in Southern Africa to refer to mixed people of African and European descent. The colonisation of the Cape Colony by the Dutch East India Company led to the importation of Indonesian, East African and Southeast Asian slaves, who intermingled with Dutch settlers and the indigenous population leading to the development of a creolized population in the early 1700s. Additionally, Portuguese traders mixed with African communities, in what is now present day Mozambique and Zimbabwe, to create the Prazeros and Luso-Africans, who were loyal to the Portuguese crown and served to advance its interests in southeastern Africa. A legacy of this era are the numerous Portuguese words that have entered Shona, Tsonga and Makonde. Today, mixed race communities exist across the region, notably so in South Africa, Namibia and Zimbabwe. In colonial era Zambia, the term Eurafrican was often used though it has largely fallen out of use in the modern era and is no longer recognized at the national level. Today, South African Coloureds and Cape Malay form the majority of the population in the Western Cape and a plurality in the Northern Cape.

In addition to Coloured people, the term mestiço is used in Angola and Mozambique to refer to mixed race people, who enjoyed a certain privilege during the Portuguese era.

=== West Africa ===
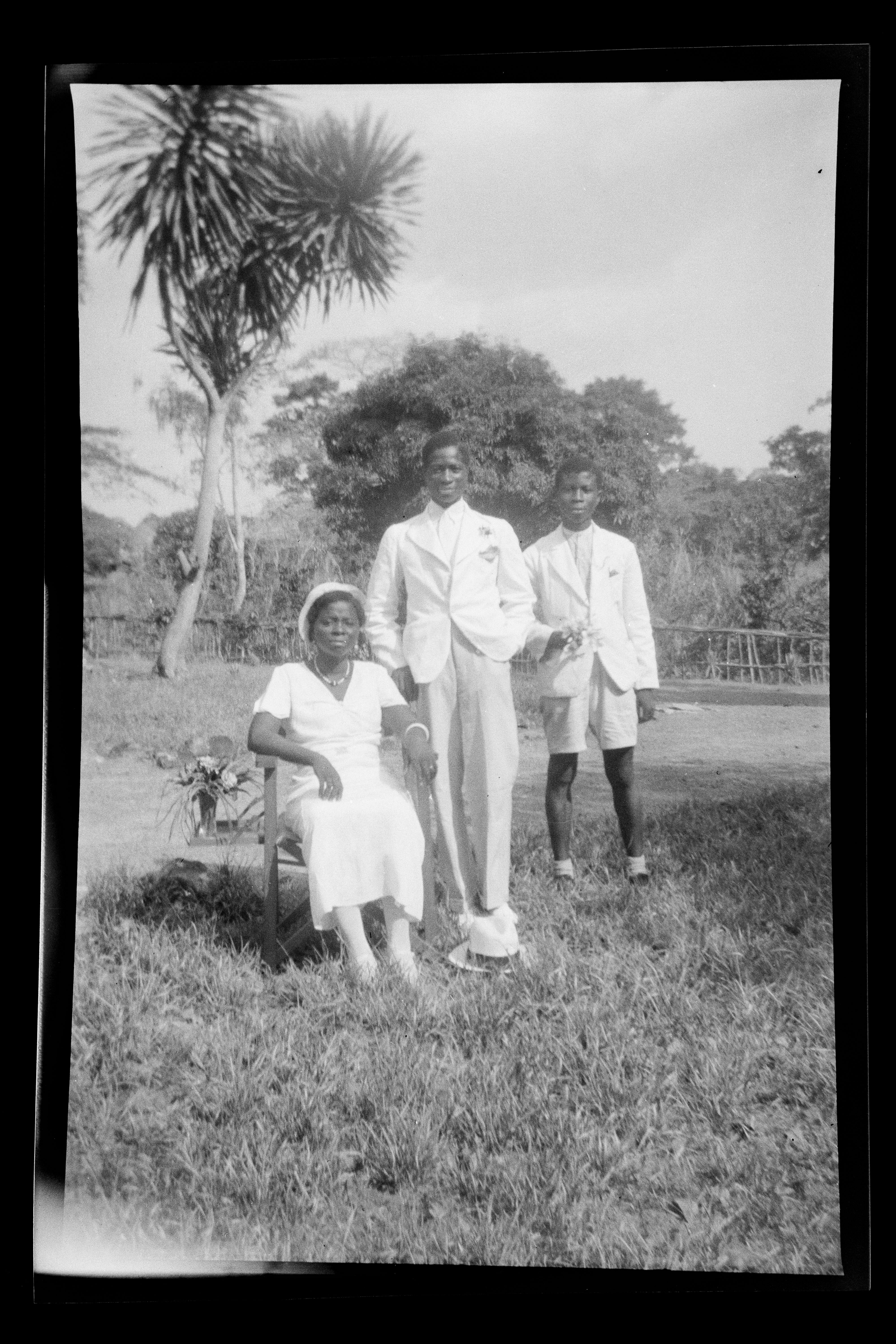
Portrait of a Creole family in Sierra Leone, early 1900s.

In Sierra Leone, the mingling of newly freed Africans and mixed heritage Nova Scotians and Jamaican Maroons from the Western hemisphere and Liberated Africans - such as the Akan, Igbo people, and Yoruba people - over several generations in the late 18th and early 19th centuries led to the eventual creation of the aristocratic ethnic group now known as the Creoles. Thoroughly westernized in their manners and bourgeois in their methods, the Creoles established a comfortable dominance in the country through a combination of British colonial favouritism and political and economic activity. Their influence in the modern republic remains considerable, and their language Krio - an English-based creole language - is the lingua franca and de facto national language spoken throughout the country.

The extension of these Sierra Leoneans' business and religious activities to neighbouring Nigeria in the late 19th and early 20th centuries - where many of them had ancestral ties - subsequently caused the creation of an offshoot in that country, the Saros. Now often considered to be part of the wider Yoruba ethnicity, the Saros have been prominent in politics, the law, religion, the arts, and journalism.

=== Portuguese Africa ===
Atlantic Creole is a term coined by historian Ira Berlin to describe a group of people from Angola and Central Africa in the 16th and 17th centuries with cultural or ethnic ties to Africa, Europe, and sometimes the Caribbean. They often had Portuguese names and were sometimes mixed race. Their knowledge of different cultures made them skilled traders and negotiators, but some were enslaved and arrived in the Chesapeake Colonies as the Charter Generation of slaves during the Transatlantic Slave Trade before 1660.

The Crioulos of mixed Portuguese and African descent eventually gave rise to several major ethnic groups in Africa, especially in Cape Verde, Guinea-Bissau, São Tomé e Príncipe, Equatorial Guinea (especially Annobón Province), Ziguinchor (Casamance), Angola, Mozambique. Only a few of these groups have retained the name crioulo or variations of it:

- Cape Verde

the dominant ethnic group, called Kriolus or Kriols in the local language; the language itself is also called "Creole";

- Guinea-Bissau

Crioulos

- São Tomé and Príncipe

Crioulos

=== Indian Ocean ===
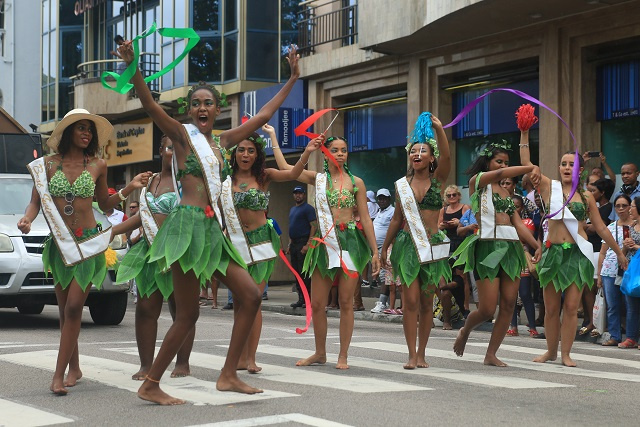
Women at the Seychelles Creole Festival in Victoria celebrate their heritage.

The usage of creole in the islands of the southwest of the Indian Ocean varies according to the island. In Mauritius, Mauritian Creoles will be identified based on both ethnicity and religion. Mauritian Creoles being either people who are of Mauritian ancestry or those who are both racially mixed and Christian. The Mauritian Constitution identifies four communities namely, Hindu, Muslim, Chinese and the General Population. Creoles are included in the General Population category along with white Christians.

The term also indicates the same to the people of Seychelles. On Réunion the term creole applies to all people born on the island.

In all three societies, creole also refers to the new languages derived from French and incorporating other languages.

== Former Spanish colonies ==
In regions that were formerly colonies of Spain, the Spanish word criollo (implying "native born") historically denoted a class in the colonial caste system comprising people born in the colonies with total or mostly European, mainly Spanish, descent. Those with mostly European descent were considered on the basis of their “passing” for white. For example, many castizos could've gotten away with passing as criollo because their features would be strikingly European and so many of them would assume such identity in passing, mainly for economic reasons. "Criollo" came to refer to things distinctive of the region, as it is used today, in expressions such as "comida criolla" ("country" food from the area).

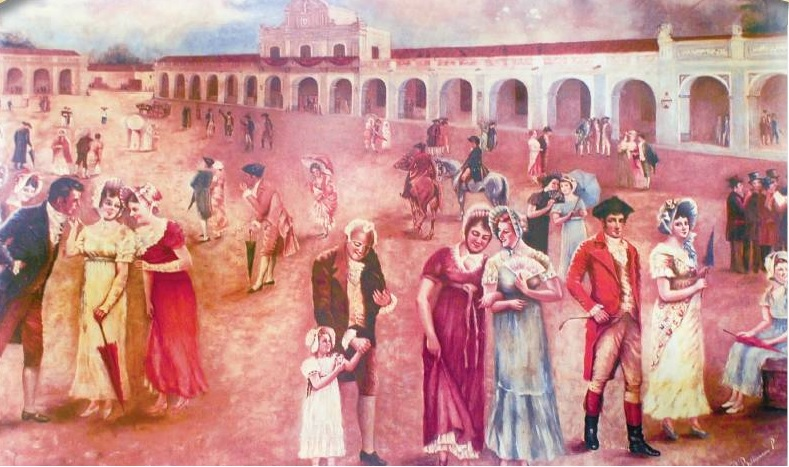
Criollos in Guatemala celebrating independence from Spain, 1821.

In the latter period of settlement of Latin America called La Colonia, the Bourbon Spanish Crown preferred Spanish-born Peninsulares (literally "born in the Iberian Peninsula") over Criollos for the top military, administrative, and religious offices due to the former mismanagement of the colonies on a previous Habsburg era.

In Argentina, in an ambiguous ethnoracial way, criollo currently is used for people whose ancestors were already present in the territory in the colonial period, regardless of their ethnicity. The exception are dark-skinned African people and current Indigenous groups.

The word criollo is the origin and cognate of the French word creole.

=== Spanish America ===
The racially-based caste system was in force throughout the Spanish viceroyalties in the Americas, since the 16th century. During the early Spanish colonial period the Spaniards had a policy of selecting promising assimilationist Indigenous persons to educate and indoctrinate. They were accepted into the colonial leadership but sometimes remained in Spain. Among the descendants of these assimilated sons of chiefs are the Aztec descended Moctezuma de Tultengo. By the 19th century, this discrimination and the example of the American Revolution and the ideals of the Enlightenment eventually led the Spanish American Criollo elite to rebel against the Spanish rule. With the support of the lower classes, they engaged Spain in the Spanish American wars of independence (1810–1826), which ended with the break-up of the former Spanish Empire in the Americas into a number of independent republics.

=== Spanish Philippines ===
Persons of pure Spanish descent born in the islands of the Spanish Philippines were called Insulares ("islanders") or Criollos.

Although many of the Spanish Americans in the islands were also persons of pure Spanish descent, they, along with many Mestizos and Castizos from Spanish America living in the East Indies were also classified as "Americanos".

== Caribbean ==
In many parts of the Southern Caribbean, the term Creole people is used to refer to the mixed-race descendants of Europeans and Africans born in the islands. Over time, there was intermarriage with Amerindians and residents from Asia, the Middle East and Latin America as well. They eventually formed a common culture based on their experience of living together in countries colonized by the French, Spanish, Dutch, and British.

A typical Creole person from the Caribbean has French, Spanish, Portuguese, British, Dutch or Jewish ancestry, mixed with sub-Saharan African ethnicities, and sometimes mixed with Indigenous peoples of the Americas. As workers from Asia entered the Caribbean, Creole people of colour intermarried with Arabs, Indians, Chinese, Javanese, Filipinos, Koreans, and Hmongs. The latter combinations were especially common in Guadeloupe. The foods and cultures are the result of creolization of these influences.

=== Caribbean languages ===
"Kreyòl" or "Kwéyòl" or "Patois/Patwa" refers to the French-lexicon Creole languages in the Caribbean, including Antillean French Creole, Haitian Creole, and Trinidadian Creole. Creole also refers to Bajan Creole, Bahamian Creole, Belizean Creole, Guyanese Creole, Jamaican Patois, Tobagonian Creole, Trinidadian Creole and Sranan Tongo (Surinamese Creole), among others.

People speak French-lexicon Antillean Creole in the following islands:

- St. Lucia
- Martinique
- Dominica
- Guadeloupe
- St. Martin
- Saint-Barthélemy
- Trinidad and Tobago
- Grenada

== See also ==
- Criollo people
- Creole nationalism
- Blanqueamiento
- Creolisation
- Indo people
- Kristang people
- McGill family (Monrovia)
- Mestizo
- Métis
- Mulatto
