= Overseas province =

Former designation used by Portugal for its overseas possession

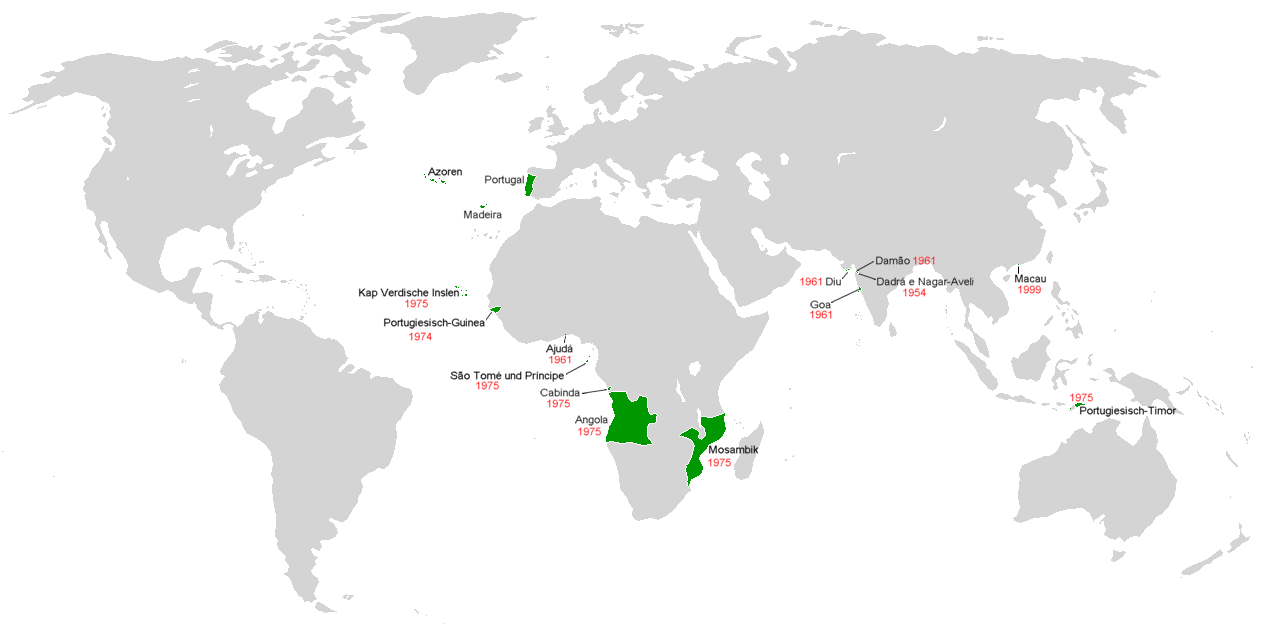
Portugal 1916-1974

Overseas province (Portuguese: província ultramarina) was a designation used by Portugal for its overseas possessions, located outside Europe.

== History ==
In the early 19th century, Portuguese overseas territories were referred to as "overseas dominions", but administrative reforms made the term "provinces" begin to be used, while Azores and Madeira became integral parts of Portugal. That was in keeping with the idea of pluricontinentalism, or the idea that Portugal existed as a transcontinental country and that its territories were integral to the Portuguese state. Overseas possessions had already been seen as an element of Portuguese identity. Although administratively classified as an overseas province, Portugal's possessions in India retained the honorary title of "state".

By the 20th century, most of these territories were referred to as "colonies", but the term "province" continued to be the official designation.

The Portuguese Colonial Act – passed on 13 June 1933 as one of the fundamental statutes of the Estado Novo regime led by Salazar – eliminated "overseas province" as the official designation of the territories and fully replaced it by that of "colony". The colonies of Angola and Mozambique were themselves subdivided in provinces.

The name was renamed again in 1951 as part of the policy of Salazar's government to retain the remaining colonies and to appease anticolonial demands from the United Nations. Meanwhile, in 1970, the provinces of Angola and Mozambique received each one the honorary title of "state". The following territories were then reclassified:

- Portuguese Angola
- Portuguese Cape Verde
- Portuguese Guinea
- Portuguese Macau
- Portuguese Mozambique
- Portuguese São Tomé and Príncipe
- Portuguese Timor
- Portuguese State of India

The classification lasted until the 1974 Carnation Revolution, which led to the fall of the Estado Novo regime, the rapid decolonisation of Portuguese Africa and the invasion and occupation of Portuguese Timor by Indonesia.

In 1976, the territory of Macau was recognized as the "Chinese territory under Portuguese administration" and was granted more administrative, financial and economic autonomy. Three years later, Portugal and China agreed to rename Macau once again as a "Chinese territory under (temporary) Portuguese administration". That classification lasted until the Joint Declaration on the Question of Macau and transfer of sovereignty of Macau from Portugal to the People's Republic of China in 1999.

== See also ==
- Overseas department
- Administrative divisions of Portugal
- List of former transcontinental countries
- Lusotropicalism
- Pluricontinentalism
- United Nations Security Council Resolution 180
