= Lusotropicalism =

Historical concept of Portuguese suitability as a coloniser

Lusotropicalism (Portuguese: Lusotropicalismo) is a term and "quasi-theory" developed by Brazilian sociologist Gilberto Freyre to describe what he perceived as a distinctive character of Portuguese imperialism overseas, proposing that the Portuguese were better colonizers than other European nations.

Freyre theorized that because of Portugal's warmer climate, and having been inhabited by Celts, Romans, Visigoths, Moors and several other peoples in pre-modern times, the Portuguese were more humane, friendly, and adaptable to other climates and cultures. He saw "Portuguese-based cultures as cultures of ecumenical expansion" and suggested that "Lusotropical culture was a form of resistance against both the 'barbaric' Soviet communist influence, and the also 'barbarian' process of Americanization and capitalist expansion."

In addition, by the early 20th century, Portugal was by far the European colonial power with the oldest territorial presence overseas; in some cases its territories had been continuously settled and ruled by the Portuguese for five centuries. Lusotropicalism celebrated both actual and mythological elements of racial democracy and civilizing mission in the Portuguese Empire, encompassing a pro-miscegenation attitude toward the colonies or overseas territories. The ideology is best exemplified in the work of Freyre.

The Portuguese state embraced the ideology during its Estado Novo period.

== Background ==
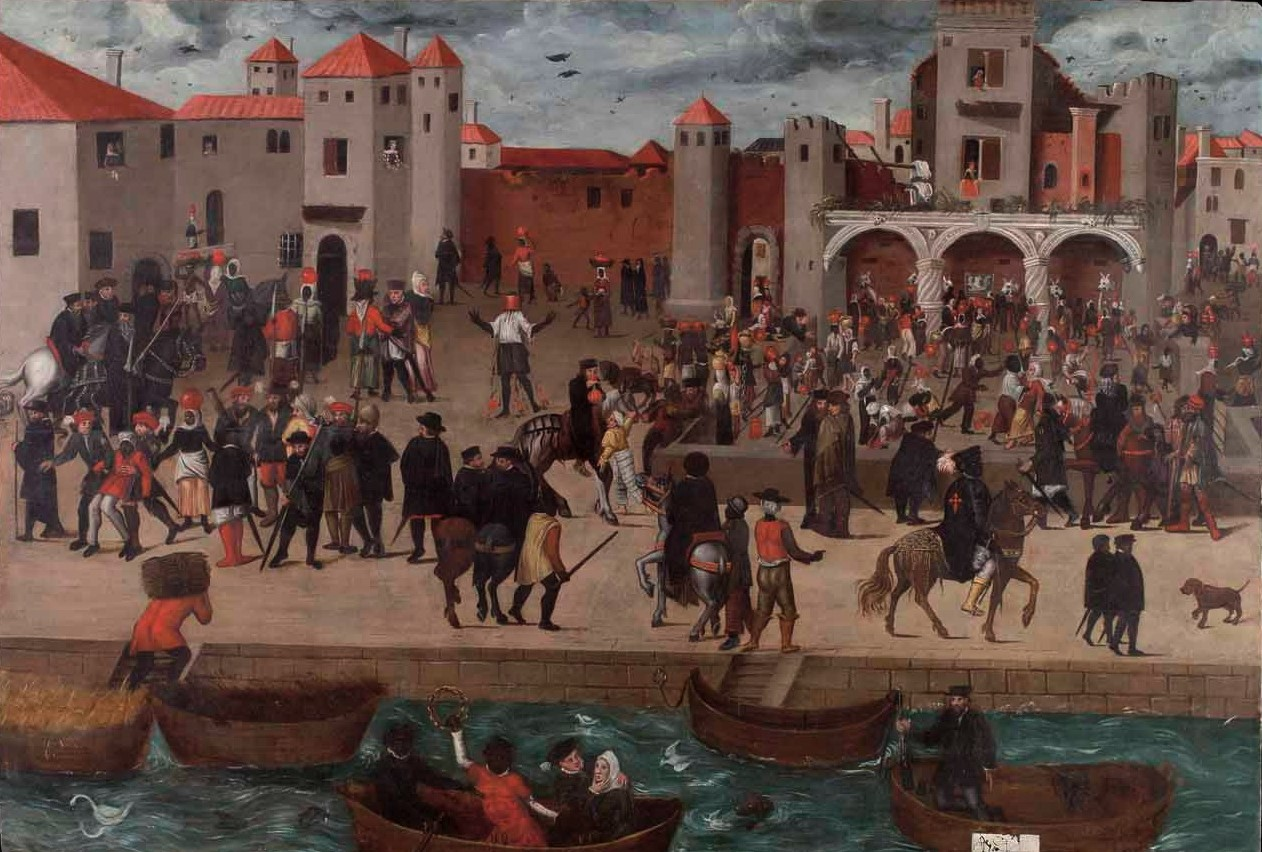
Lisbon in the 1570s had many Black Africans among its population. Some were slaves or slave traders, others were free. There were statues of Black saints in the city churches, European and African dance and fusion cuisine of both Portuguese and African origin.

During the New Imperialist Scramble for Africa of the 1890s onward, Portugal expanded its coastal African territories in modern Angola, Mozambique, and Guinea-Bissau inland. After the 1910 Portuguese Revolution, and as an official policy of the 1933–1974 Estado Novo dictatorship, Black people in Portuguese Africa were de jure eligible for full Portuguese citizenship and its attendant rights. In practice, Black people hardly ever achieved such status.

== View ==
Lusotropicalism sought to cast Portugal's imperialism as a "better" form of colonialism. It contended that Portugal peacefully fostered beneficial race-mixing, while the northern European countries had engaged in true colonialism.

Gilberto Freyre theorized that because of Portugal's warmer climate, and having been inhabited by Celts, Romans, Visigoths, Moors and several other peoples in pre-modern times, the Portuguese were more humane, friendly, and adaptable to other climates and cultures. He saw "Portuguese-based cultures as cultures of ecumenical expansion" and suggested that "Lusotropical culture was a form of resistance against both the 'barbaric' Soviet communist influence, and the also 'barbarian' process of Americanization and capitalist expansion."

In addition, by the early 20th century, Portugal was by far the European colonial power with the oldest territorial presence overseas; in some cases its territories had been continuously settled and ruled by the Portuguese for five centuries. Lusotropicalism celebrated both actual and mythological elements of racial democracy and civilizing mission in the Portuguese Empire, encompassing a pro-miscegenation attitude toward the colonies or overseas territories. The ideology is best exemplified in the work of Freyre.

== Application during the Estado Novo ==
Prior to Freyre's publication of Casa-Grande & Senzala, few—if any—Portuguese politicians and colonial administrators conceived of the Portuguese Empire as a multicultural, multiracial, and pluricontinental nation (the idea that Portugal was not a colonial empire but a nation-state spread across continents). They were more likely to think of Portuguese colonialism as a logical historical extension or continuation of the Reconquista. For example, Armindo Monteiro, Portuguese Minister of Colonies between 1931 and 1935, is considered a "social Darwinist" due to being a proponent of the traditional colonial "civilizing mission" and white saviorism. Monteiro believed Portugal had a "historic obligation" to civilize the "inferior races" who lived in its African and Asian territories by converting them to Christianity and teaching them a work ethic.

Salazar adopted lusotropicalism by asserting that since Portugal had been a multicultural, multiracial, and pluricontinental nation since the 15th century, losing its overseas territories in Africa and Asia would dismember the country and end Portuguese independence.

== Influence on Hispanism ==
In Hispanic circles, an "Ibero-tropicalist" movement has been developed, with the aim of developing an anthropology of mestizaje based on the similarities between the Portuguese colonial model and the Spanish one to integrate the native peoples and having organically given a transculturation that forged a syncretic identity of Iberian and Indies roots. This "Ibero-tropicalism" considers that Iberism should not be understood as something purely European, but as an Ibero-Afro-American identity in which cultures of 3 great civilizations were integrated into a single transcontinental social community, evidenced in the cultural exchange present in food (beans, cocoa or potatoes), genes (Mestizaje), clothes, music (Reggaeton), terminologies, etc. in a common heritage (in addition to mutual migratory currents). This sociological approach would make Spain and Portugal be understood as nations that are not purely European, but also American and African; and analogously with the fact that Ibero-America is not purely American, but also European and African, just as Portuguese Africa and Spanish Africa are not purely African, but also European and American; and that all these regions with a common tradition would be part of the Iberian Civilization and its plural character (expressed in the Hispanidad or Lusophonie).

Iberotropicalism is not an idealistic justification of Iberian colonialism, but rather provides a theoretical basis for the extraordinary civilizing capacity of black Africans in situations of subordination. It is still necessary to develop an autonomous African Iberotropicalism to remove the stigma of the cynical instrumentalization of the Portuguese Estado Novo and of Brazilian “racial democracy.” Iberotropicalism is science and literature. More literature than science, according to its own author, since it is humanism in its purest form. Not in vain, Darcy Ribeiro, a great left-wing Iberotropical anthropologist, said that Freyre is on a par with Cervantes. Not because being fanciful, but because describes sociological reality more accurately than science.

— Pablo González Velasco

== See also ==
- Eurasianism
- Lusosphere
- Overseas province
- Pluricontinentalism
- Racial democracy
- Luso-Africans
  - Assimilados
  - Prazeros
  - Lançados
  - Mestiços
  - Órfãs do Rei
- Tropicalismo
- Fifth Empire
