= Lançados =

Early Portuguese settlers in West Africa

The lançados, literally "those who were thrown out" (i.e. forcibly deported), were settlers and colonizers of Portuguese origin in Senegambia, Cabo Verde, Guinea, Sierra Leone, and other areas on the coast of West Africa. Many were Jews—often New Christians—escaping persecution from the Portuguese Inquisition.

Lançados often took African wives from local ruling families, thereby securing protection and trading ties that worked to the advantage of both sides. They established clandestine trading networks in weaponry, spices, and slaves. This black market angered the Portuguese Crown by disrupting its ability to collect taxes.

Although never large in numbers, the mixed-race children born to the lançados and their African wives and concubines served as crucial intermediaries between Europeans and native Africans. They were often bilingual and grew up in both cultures, sometimes working as interpreters with traders. These mixed-race people wielded significant power in the early development of port economies in Bissau, Cacheu, and surrounding areas.

== History ==
=== Origin ===
At the time of Prince Henry the Navigator's death in 1460, the Portuguese had visited the West African coast from Cabo Verde as far south as the equator. They were familiar with points in between such as present-day Sierra Leone and Elmina (the latter in present-day Ghana). The Portuguese monarchy attempted to hold a total monopoly over the West African slave trade by nominating official intermediaries for that purpose.

In 1479 Portugal and Castile signed the Treaty of Alcáçovas ending the War of the Castilian Succession. During the war Castile had contested the Portuguese slave trade monopoly by threatening Portuguese outposts and unsuccessfully attacking their fleet in the Gulf of Guinea. With their main European rival neutralized, Portugal expanded its trade networks and settlements in West Africa essentially unopposed throughout the 15th century. During that century various Portuguese settlers, adventurers, and merchants traveled to the coastal areas and archipelagos of West Africa—particularly Cabo Verde—either voluntarily or by force. Some were merchants or agents of commercial enterprises who "threw themselves" willingly ("lançavam") into contact with African peoples for trading purposes, and often circumvented the Portuguese monarchy's monopolistic taxes.

However, the majority of lançados were legally or voluntarily exiled to Africa, including Jews and New Christians escaping the Portuguese Inquisition, and persons called degredados serving out legally imposed exiles. A small minority of lançados were not Portuguese but Spanish, Greek, or Indian.

Lançados would live and trade in coastal areas, either individually or in small groups, and with the knowledge and protection of native Africans. Over time some lançado settlements grew large enough that they could impose violence on local peoples without fear of reprisal. They also built their own ships and recruited Africans known as grumetes to serve as auxiliary soldiers.

The lançados were primarily active on the Senegal, Gambia, Casamance, and Guinea valleys; the Cacheu and Geba River regions in current-day Guinea-Bissau; and in the Port Loko region in current-day Sierra Leone. They lived as far southwest as Elmina. Perhaps their largest settlements were at Buba and Rio Grande de Buba in present-day Guinea-Bissau.

It was uncommon for male lançados to bring Portuguese or other white women with them to Africa. Instead, they took African wives or concubines, fathering Afro-Portuguese children with them. Some individual lançados lived so long with African people that they integrated into local cultures, abandoning their previous Portuguese identities. Sustained contact between the Portuguese and local African peoples established Portuguese—or at least a proto-creole derived from Portuguese—as a West African lingua franca almost as widespread as the native Mande languages.

The coastal lançados and their descendants constituted a new sociocultural group that spoke Portuguese, dressed in European clothes, and lived in rectangular Portuguese-style houses with whitewashed walls and verandas. They also adopted local African customs such as tattooing and scarification. Their religious beliefs were likewise a mix of Catholicism, West African Vodun, and ancestor worship. The strong linguistic and familial ties between the lançados, their descendants, and native people resulted in a distinct Luso-African culture that partially persists into the 21st century.

=== Peak and decline ===
The number of lançados grew quickly during the first half of the 16th century in response to the persecution of Jews by Portuguese kings Manuel I and João III. The lançados supported and acted as intermediaries for an increasing number of French, English, and Dutch trading along the West African coast from Cabo Verde to Elmina. In order to combat this trade, the Kingdom of Portugal established fortified trading posts called feitorias at strategic points along the Gulf of Guinea coast.

During the Iberian Union—from the late 16th to early 17th centuries—lançados started trading with the Susu and Mandé peoples. They lived relatively far inland. Throughout the 17th and 18th centuries, lançados and their descendants controlled local commerce in the inland regions of Guinea.

As the quantity of white Portuguese migrants declined from the 17th century onward, lançado descendants with mixed European and African blood began to outnumber Europeans. Towards the end of the 17th century these mulattos or mestiços became a sociocultural elite in the wider Afro-Portuguese community, as they outnumbered both white and black people. During this time they also controlled trade with the Biafada people and the Port Loko region.

The lançados declined in importance starting in the 18th century. At that time the Portuguese monarchy assumed direct colonial control of coastal areas and began negotiating with indigenous rulers.

== Notable Lançados ==
- Bibiana Vaz (c. 1630–1694+)
- Ganagoga (late 16th/early 17th century)

== See also ==
- African Portuguese
- Assimilados
- Degredados
- Luso-Africans
- Lusotropicalism
- Mestiço
- Órfãs do Rei
- Pluricontinentalism
- Prazeros
- Retornados
- Signares
