= Civilizing mission =

Rationale or justification for colonialism

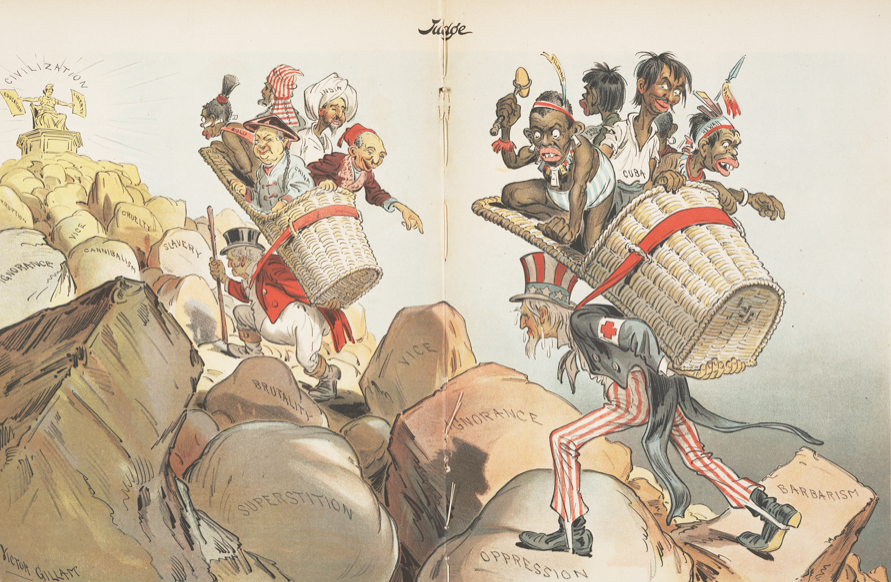
The editorial cartoon "The White Man's Burden (Apologies to Rudyard Kipling)" shows John Bull (U.K.) and Uncle Sam (U.S.) delivering the world's people of colour to civilization (Victor Gillam, Judge magazine, 1 April 1899). The people in the basket carried by Uncle Sam are labelled Cuba, Hawaii, Samoa, "Porto Rico", and the Philippines, while the people in the basket carried by John Bull are labelled Zulu, China, India, "Soudan", and Egypt.

The civilizing mission (French: mission civilisatrice) is a political rationale for military intervention and for colonization purporting to facilitate the cultural assimilation of indigenous peoples, especially in the period from the 15th to the 20th centuries.

The civilizing mission was primarily the cultural justification for the colonization in French colonies. In the Russian Empire, it was also associated with the Russian conquest of Central Asia The civilizing mission was also a common justification for the British and German colonialism. The Western colonial powers claimed that, as Christian nations, they were duty bound to disseminate Western civilization to what they perceived as heathen, primitive cultures. It was also applied by the Empire of Japan, which colonized Korea.

== Origins ==
In the eighteenth century, Europeans saw history as a linear, inevitable, and perpetual process of sociocultural evolution led by Western Europe. From the reductionist cultural perspective of Western Europe, colonialists saw non-Europeans as "backward nations", as people intrinsically incapable of socioeconomic progress. In France, the philosopher Marquis de Condorcet formally postulated the existence of a European "holy duty" to help non-European peoples "which, to civilize themselves, wait only to receive the means from us, to find brothers among Europeans, and to become their friends and disciples". For example, the 1681 charter of Pennsylvania states that the colonists must reduce "the savage Natives by gentle and just manners to the Love of Civil Societie and Christian Religion." A recurring theme in colonial charters, the 1606 First Virginia Charter similarly mentions the "propagating of Christian religion to such people, as yet live in darkness and miserable ignorance of the true knowledge and worship of God, and may in time bring the infidels and savages, living in those parts, to human civility, and to a settled and quiet government".

Modernization theory – progressive transition from traditional, premodern society to modern, industrialized society – proposed that the economic self-development of a non-European people is incompatible with retaining their culture (mores, traditions, customs). That breaking from their old culture is prerequisite either to utter disappearance or to socioeconomic progress by way of practical revolutions in the sociocultural and religious institutions, which would change their collective psychology, mental attitude, philosophy and way of life. Therefore, development criticism sees economic development as a continuation of the civilizing mission. That to become civilized invariably means to become more "like us", therefore "civilizing a people" means that every society must become a capitalist consumer society, by renouncing their native culture to become Westernized. Cultivation of land and people has been a similarly employed concept, used instead of civilizing in German speaking colonial contexts to press for colonization and cultural imperialism through "extensive cultivation" and "culture work".

According to Jennifer Pitts, there was considerable skepticism among French and British liberal thinkers (such as Adam Smith, Jeremy Bentham, Edmund Burke, Denis Diderot and Marquis de Condorcet) about empire in the 1780s. However, by the mid-19th century, liberal thinkers such as John Stuart Mill and Alexis de Tocqueville endorsed empire on the basis of the civilizing mission.

== By state ==
=== Britain ===
Although the British did not invent the term, the notion of a "civilizing mission" was equally important for them to justify colonialism. It was used to legitimatize British rule over the colonized, especially when the colonial enterprise was not very profitable.

The British used their sports as a tool to spread their values and culture among native populations, as well as a way of emphasizing their own dominance, as they were the owners of the rules of these sports and were naturally more experienced at playing these games. Test cricket, for example, was seen as a sport that inherently involved values of fair play and civilizedness. In some cases, British sports served a purpose of providing exercise and integration across social boundaries for native populations. The growth of British sports led to a natural decline of the colonized peoples' sports, creating fear amongst some that a loss of their native culture might hamper their ability to resist colonial rule. Over time, colonized peoples ended up seeing British sports as a venue to prove their equality to the British, and victories against the British in sports gave momentum to nascent independence movements.

The idea that the British were bringing civilization to the uncivilized areas of the world is famously expressed in Rudyard Kipling's 1899 poem "The White Man's Burden".

=== France ===
French historian Raoul Girardet describes the French ideology of "civilizing" Africans as "colonial humanism". French colonists viewed the civilizations of the peoples they were subjugating as "backward" and considered the act of colonization to be beneficial to them. According to Jules Brévié, former governor-general of French West Africa and French Indochina, the French also leveraged the idea of being ostensible colonial protectors of indigenous culture.

=== United States ===
The concept of a "civilizing mission" would also be adopted by the United States during the age of New Imperialism in the late 19th and early 20th centuries. Such projects would include US annexation of the Philippines during the aftermath of the Spanish-American War in 1898. The McKinley administration would declare that the US position within the Philippines was to “oversee the establishment of a civilian government” on the model of the United States. That would be done through adopting a civilizing process that would entail a "medical reformation" and other socioeconomic reforms. The Spanish health system had broken down after the 1898 war and was replaced with an American military model, which was made up of public health institutions. The "medical reformation" was done with "military rigor" as part of a civilizing process in which American public health officers set out to train native Filipinos the "correct techniques of the body." The process of "rationalized hygiene" was a technique for colonizing in the Philippines, as part of the American physicists assurance that the colonized Philippines was inhabited with propriety. Other "sweeping reforms and ambitious public works projects" would include the implementation of a free public school system, as well as architecture to develop "economic growth and civilizing influence" as an important component of McKinley's "benevolent assimilation."

Similar "civilizing" tactics were also incorporated into the American colonization of Puerto Rico in 1900. They would include extensive reform such as the legalization of divorce in 1902 in an attempt to instill American social mores into the island’s populace to "legitimatize the emerging colonial order."

Purported benefits for the colonized nation included "greater exploitation of natural resources, increased production of material goods, raised living standards, expanded market profitability and sociopolitical stability".

However, the occupation of Haiti in 1915 would also show a darker side to the American "civilizing mission." The historian Mary Renda has argued that the occupation of Haiti was solely for the "purposes of economic exploitation and strategic advantage," rather than to provide Haiti with "protection, education and economic support."

=== Portugal ===
After consolidating its territory in the 13th century through a Reconquista of the Muslim states of Western Iberia, the Kingdom of Portugal started to expand overseas. In 1415, Islamic Ceuta was occupied by the Portuguese during the reign of John I of Portugal. Portuguese expansion in North Africa was the beginning of a larger process eventually known as the Portuguese Overseas Expansion, under which the Kingdom's goals included the expansion of Christianity into Muslim lands and the desire of nobility for epic acts of war and conquest with the support of the Pope.

As the Portuguese extended their influence around the coast to Mauritania, Senegambia (by 1445) and Guinea, they created trading posts. Rather than become direct competitors to the Muslim merchants, they used expanding market opportunities in Europe and the Mediterranean to increase trade across the Sahara. In addition, Portuguese merchants gained access to the African interior via the Senegal and Gambia rivers, which crossed long-standing trans-Saharan routes. The Portuguese brought in copper ware, cloth, tools, wine and horses. Trade goods soon also included arms and ammunition. In exchange, the Portuguese received gold (transported from mines of the Akan deposits), pepper (a trade which lasted until Vasco da Gama reached India in 1498) and ivory. It was not until they reached the Kongo coast in the 1480s that they moved beyond Muslim trading territory in Africa.

Forts and trading posts were established along the coast. Portuguese sailors, merchants, cartographers, priests and soldiers had the task of taking over the coastal areas, settling, and building churches, forts and factories, as well as exploring areas unknown to Europeans. A Company of Guinea was founded as a Portuguese governmental institution to control the trade, and called Casa da Guiné or Casa da Guiné e Mina from 1482 to 1483, and Casa da Índia e da Guiné in 1499.

The first of the major European trading forts, Elmina, was founded on the Gold Coast in 1482 by the Portuguese. Elmina Castle (originally known as the "São Jorge da Mina Castle") was modeled on the Castelo de São Jorge, one of the earliest royal residences in Lisbon. Elmina, which means "the port", became a major trading center. By the beginning of the colonial era, there were forty such forts operating along the coast. Rather than being icons of colonial domination, the forts acted as trading posts – they rarely saw military action – the fortifications were important, however, when arms and ammunition were being stored prior to trade. The 15th-century Portuguese exploration of the African coast, is commonly regarded as the harbinger of European colonialism, and also marked the beginnings of the Atlantic slave trade, Christian missionary evangelization and the first globalization processes which were to become a major element of the European colonialism until the end of the 18th century.

Although the Portuguese Empire's policy regarding native peoples in the less technologically advanced places around the world (most prominently in Brazil) had always been devoted to enculturation, including teaching and evangelization of the indigenous populations, as well as the creation of novel infrastructure to openly support these roles, it reached its largest extent after the 18th century in what was then Portuguese Africa and Portuguese Timor. New cities and towns, with their Europe-inspired infrastructure, which included administrative, military, healthcare, educational, religious, and entrepreneurial halls, were purportedly designed to accommodate Portuguese settlers.

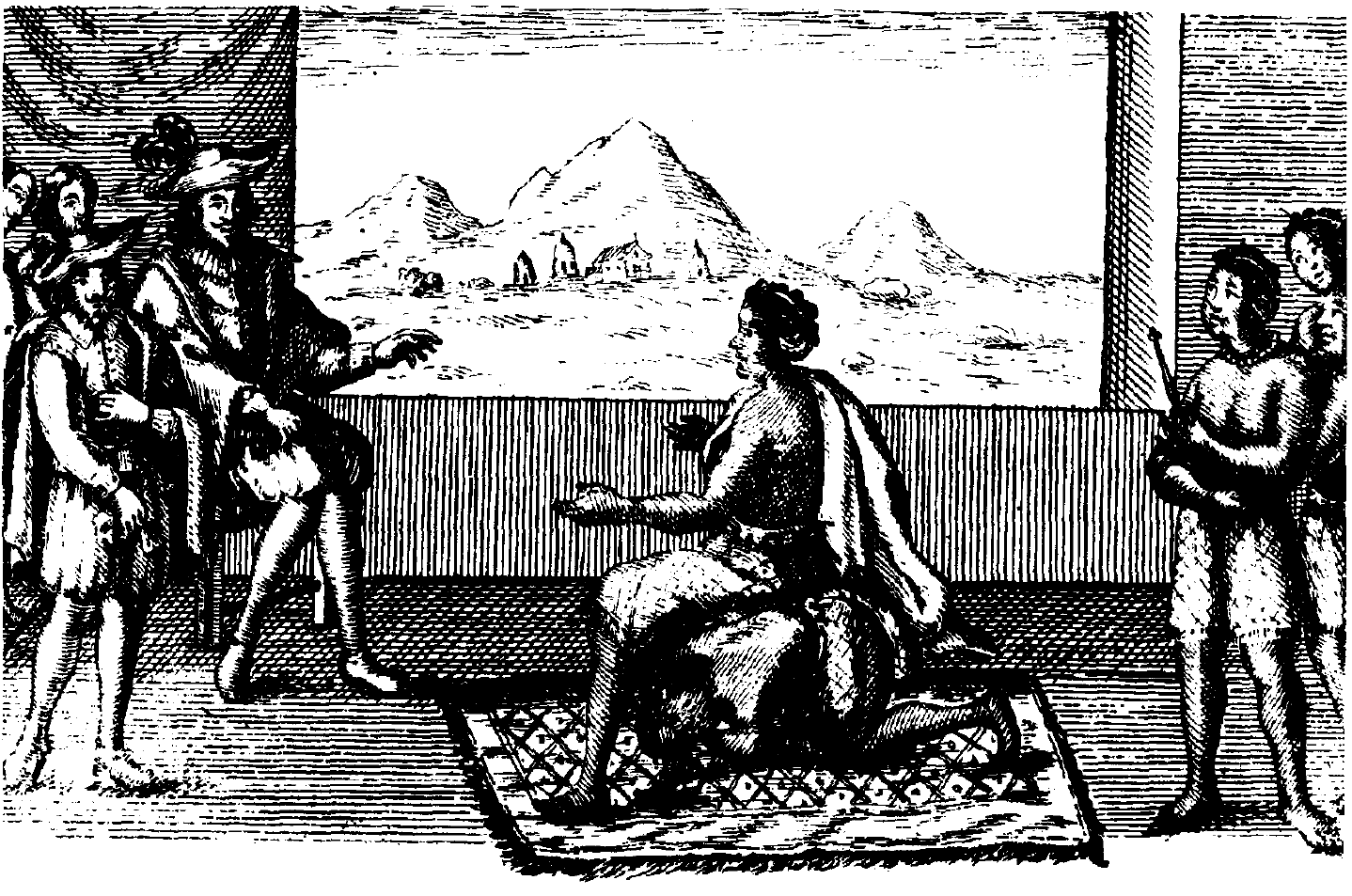
Queen Ana de Sousa Nzingha Mbande in peace negotiations with the Portuguese governor in Luanda, 1657

The Portuguese explorer Paulo Dias de Novais founded Luanda in 1575 as "São Paulo de Loanda", with a hundred families of settlers and four hundred soldiers. Benguela, a Portuguese fort from 1587 which became a town in 1617, was another important early settlement they founded and ruled. The Portuguese would establish several settlements, forts and trading posts along the coastal strip of Africa. In the Island of Mozambique, one of the first places where the Portuguese permanently settled in Sub-Saharan Africa, they built the Chapel of Nossa Senhora de Baluarte, in 1522, now considered the oldest European building in the Southern Hemisphere. Later the hospital, a majestic neo-classical building constructed in 1877 by the Portuguese, with a garden decorated with ponds and fountains, was for many years the biggest hospital south of the Sahara.

==== Estatuto do Indigenato ====
The establishment of a dual, racialized civil society was formally recognized in Estatuto do Indigenato (The Statute of Indigenous Populations) adopted in 1929, and was based in the subjective concept of civilization versus tribalism. Portugal's colonial authorities were totally committed to develop a fully multiethnic "civilized" society in its African colonies, but that goal or "civilizing mission", would only be achieved after a period of Europeanization or enculturation of the native black tribes and ethnocultural groups. It was a policy which had already been stimulated in the former Portuguese colony of Brazil. Under Portugal's Estado Novo regime, headed by António de Oliveira Salazar, the Estatuto established a distinction between the "colonial citizens", subject to Portuguese law and entitled to citizenship rights and duties effective in the "metropole", and the indigenas (natives), subject to both colonial legislation and their customary, tribal laws.

Between the two groups, there was a third small group, the assimilados, comprising native blacks, mulatos, Asians, and mixed-race people, who had at least some formal education, were not subjected to paid forced labor, were entitled to some citizenship rights, and held a special identification card that differed from the one imposed on the immense mass of the African population (the indigenas), a card that the colonial authorities conceived of as a means of controlling the movements of forced labor (CEA 1998). The indigenas were subject to the traditional authorities, who were gradually integrated into the colonial administration and charged with solving disputes, managing the access to land, and guaranteeing the flows of workforce and the payment of taxes. As several authors have pointed out (Mamdani 1996; Gentili 1999; O'Laughlin 2000), the Indigenato regime was the political system that subordinated the immense majority of native Africans to local authorities entrusted with governing, in collaboration with the lowest echelon of the colonial administration, the "native" communities described as tribes and assumed to have a common ancestry, language, and culture.

After World War II, as communist and anti-colonial ideologies spread out across Africa, many clandestine political movements were established in support of independence. Regardless it was exaggerated anti-Portuguese/anti-"Colonial" propaganda, a dominant tendency in Portuguese Africa, or a mix of both, these movements claimed that since policies and development plans were primarily designed by the ruling authorities for the benefit of the territories' ethnic Portuguese population, little attention was paid to local tribal integration and the development of its native communities. According to the official guerrilla statements, this affected a majority of the indigenous population who suffered both state-sponsored discrimination and enormous social pressure. Many felt they had received too little opportunity or resources to upgrade their skills and improve their economic and social situation to a degree comparable to that of the Europeans. Statistically, Portuguese Africa's Portuguese whites were indeed wealthier and more skilled than the black indigenous majority, but the late 1950s, the 1960s and principally the early 1970s, were being testimony of a gradual change based in new socioeconomic developments and equalitarian policies for all.

==== Colonial wars ====
Portuguese overseas territories in Africa during the Estado Novo regime (1933–1974): Angola and Mozambique were by far the two largest of those territories

The Portuguese Colonial War began in Portuguese Angola on 4 February 1961, in an area called the Zona Sublevada do Norte (ZSN or the Rebel Zone of the North), consisting of the provinces of Zaire, Uíge and Cuanza Norte. The U.S.-backed UPA wanted national self-determination, while for the Portuguese, who had settled in Africa and ruled considerable territory since the 15th century, their belief in a multi-racial, assimilated overseas empire justified going to war to prevent its breakup and protect its populations. Portuguese leaders, including António de Oliveira Salazar, defended the policy of multiracialism, or Lusotropicalism, as a way of integrating Portuguese colonies, and their peoples, more closely with Portugal itself. For the Portuguese ruling regime, the overseas empire was a matter of national interest. In Portuguese Africa, trained Portuguese black Africans were allowed to occupy positions in several occupations including specialized military, administration, teaching, health, and other posts in the civil service and private businesses, as long as they had the right technical and human qualities. In addition, intermarriage of black women with white Portuguese men was a common practice since the earlier contacts with the Europeans. The access to basic, secondary, and technical education was being expanded and its availability was being increasingly opened to both the indigenous and European Portuguese of the territories.

Examples of this policy include several black Portuguese Africans who would become prominent individuals during the war or in the post-independence, and who had studied during the Portuguese rule of the territories in local schools or even in Portuguese schools and universities in the mainland (the metropole) – Samora Machel, Mário Pinto de Andrade, Marcelino dos Santos, Eduardo Mondlane, Agostinho Neto, Amílcar Cabral, Joaquim Chissano, and Graça Machel are just a few examples. Two large state-run universities were founded in Portuguese Africa in the early 1960s (the Universidade de Luanda in Angola and the Universidade de Lourenço Marques in Mozambique, awarding a wide range of degrees from engineering to medicine), during a time that in the European mainland only four public universities were in operation, two of them in Lisbon (which compares with the 14 Portuguese public universities today). Several figures in Portuguese society, including one of the most idolized sports stars in Portuguese football history, a black football player from Portuguese East Africa named Eusébio, were other examples of assimilation and multiracialism.

Since 1961, with the beginning of the colonial wars in its overseas territories, Portugal had begun to incorporate black Portuguese Africans in the war effort in Angola, Portuguese Guinea, and Portuguese Mozambique based on concepts of multi-racialism and preservation of the empire. African participation on the Portuguese side of the conflict ranged from marginal roles as laborers and informers to participation in highly trained operational combat units, including platoon commanders. As the war progressed, the use of African counterinsurgency troops increased; on the eve of the military coup of 25 April 1974, Africans accounted for more than 50 percent of Portuguese forces fighting the war. Due to the technological gap between both civilizations and the centuries-long colonial era, Portugal was a driving force in the development and shaping of all Portuguese Africa since the 15th century.

In the 1960s and early 1970s, in order to counter the increasing insurgency of the nationalistic guerrillas and show to the Portuguese people and the world that the overseas territories were totally under control, the Portuguese government accelerated its major development programs to expand and attempted to upgrade the infrastructure of the overseas territories in Africa by creating new roads, railways, bridges, dams, irrigation systems, schools and hospitals to stimulate an even higher level of economic growth and support from the populace. As part of this redevelopment program, construction of the Cahora Bassa Dam began in 1969 in the Overseas Province of Mozambique (the official designation of Portuguese Mozambique by then). This particular project became intrinsically linked with Portugal's concerns over security in the overseas colonies. The Portuguese government viewed the construction of the dam as a testimony to Portugal's "civilizing mission" and intended for the dam to reaffirm Mozambican belief in the strength and security of the Portuguese colonial government.

==== Brazil ====
Portuguese map by Lopo Homem (c. 1519) showing the coast of Brazil and natives extracting brazilwood, as well as Portuguese ships

When the Portuguese explorers arrived in 1500, the Amerindians were mostly semi-nomadic tribes, with the largest population living on the coast and along the banks of major rivers. Unlike Christopher Columbus who thought he had reached India, the Portuguese sailor Vasco da Gama had already reached India sailing around Africa two years before Pedro Álvares Cabral reached Brazil. Nevertheless, the word índios ("Indians") was by then established to designate the peoples of the New World and remains so (it is used to this day in the Portuguese language, the people of India being called indianos).

Initially, the Europeans saw the natives as noble savages, and miscegenation began straight away. Tribal warfare and cannibalism convinced the Portuguese that they should "civilize" the Amerindians, even if one of the four groups of Aché people in Paraguay practiced cannibalism regularly until the 1960s. When the Kingdom of Portugal's explorers discovered Brazil in the 15th century and started to colonize its new possessions in the New World, the territory was inhabited by various indigenous peoples and tribes which had developed neither a writing system nor school education.

The Society of Jesus (Jesuits) has been since its founding in 1540 as a missionary order. Evangelization was one of the primary goals of the Jesuits; however, they were also committed to an education both in Europe and overseas. Their missionary activities, both in the cities and in the countryside, were complemented by a strong commitment to education. This took the form of the opening of schools for young boys, first in Europe, but soon extended to both America and Asia. The foundation of Catholic missions, schools, and seminaries was another consequence of the Jesuit involvement in education. As the spaces and cultures where the Jesuits were presently varied considerably, their evangelizing methods diverged by location. However, the Society's engagement in trade, architecture, science, literature, languages, arts, music, and religious debate corresponded, in fact, to the common and foremost purpose of Christianization.

By the middle of the 16th century, the Jesuits were present in West Africa, South America, Ethiopia, India, China, and Japan. In a period of history when the world had a largely illiterate population, the Portuguese Empire, was home to one of the first universities founded in Europe – the University of Coimbra, which currently is still one of the oldest universities. Throughout the centuries of Portuguese rule, Brazilian students, mostly graduated in the Jesuit missions and seminaries, were allowed and even encouraged to enroll at higher education in mainland Portugal. By 1700, and reflecting a larger transformation of the Portuguese Empire, the Jesuits had decisively shifted their activity from the East Indies to Brazil. In the late 18th century, the Portuguese minister of the kingdom Marquis of Pombal attacked the power of the privileged nobility and the church and expelled the Jesuits from Portugal and its overseas possessions. Pombal seized the Jesuit schools and introduced educational reforms all over the empire.

In 1772, even before the establishment of the Science Academy of Lisbon (1779), one of the first learned societies of both Brazil and the Portuguese Empire, the Sociedade Scientifica, was founded in Rio de Janeiro. Furthermore, in 1797, the first botanic institute was founded in Salvador, Bahia. During the late 18th century, the Escola Politécnica (then the Real Academia de Artilharia, Fortificação e Desenho) of Rio de Janeiro was created in 1792 through a decree issued by the Portuguese authorities as a higher education school for the teaching of the sciences and engineering. It belongs today to the Universidade Federal do Rio de Janeiro and is the oldest engineering school of Brazil, and one of the oldest in Latin America. A royal letter of November 20, 1800 by the King John VI of Portugal established in Rio de Janeiro the Aula Prática de Desenho e Figura, the first institution in Brazil dedicated to teaching the arts. During colonial times, the arts were mainly religious or utilitarian and were learned in a system of apprenticeship. A Decree of August 12, 1816, created an Escola Real de Ciências, Artes e Ofícios (Royal School of Sciences, Arts and Crafts), which established an official education in the fine arts and was the foundation of the current Escola Nacional de Belas Artes.

In the 19th century, the Portuguese royal family, headed by João VI, arrived in Rio de Janeiro escaping from the Napoleon's army invasion of Portugal in 1807. João VI gave impetus to the expansion of European civilization in Brazil. In a short period between 1808 and 1810, the Portuguese government founded the Royal Naval Academy and the Royal Military Academy, the Biblioteca Nacional, the Rio de Janeiro Botanical Garden, the Medico-Chirurgical School of Bahia, currently known as the "Faculdade de Medicina" under the purview of the Universidade Federal da Bahia and the Medico-Chirurgical School of Rio de Janeiro which is the modern-day Faculdade de Medicina of the Universidade Federal do Rio de Janeiro.

=== Chile ===
Nineteenth century elites of South American republics also used a civilizing mission rhetoric to justify armed actions against indigenous groups. On January 1, 1883, Chile refounded the old city of Villarrica, thus formally ending the process of the occupation of the indigenous lands of Araucanía. Six months later, on June 1, president Domingo Santa María declared:

The country has with satisfaction seen the problem of the reduction of the whole Araucanía solved. This event, so important to our social and political life, and so significant for the future of the republic, has ended, happily and with costly and painful sacrifices. Today the whole Araucanía is subjugated, more than to the material forces, to the moral and civilizing force of the republic ...

Chileans also deployed a "civilizatory crusade" discourse against Peru and Bolivia in the War of the Pacific (1879–1884). Along these lines Peru and Bolivia were seen as representatives of a backward Ancien régime that fought its wars with armies of indigenous barbarians. Negative views of this types also occurred among Peruvians as after the war, the indigenous peoples in Peru became scapegoats in the narratives of Peruvian criollo elites, exemplified in the writing of Ricardo Palma:

The principal cause of the great defeat is that the majority of Peru is composed of that wretched and degraded race that we once attempted to dignify and ennoble. The Indian lacks patriotic sense; he is born enemy of the white and of the man of the coast. It makes no difference to him whether he is a Chilean or a Turk. To educate the Indian and to inspire him a feeling for patriotism will not be the task of our institutions, but of the ages.

== See also ==
- Christian mission – Organized effort to spread Christianity
- Cultural assimilation – Adoption of features of another culture
- Cultural backwardness – Soviet political term
- Cultural imperialism – Cultural aspects of imperialism
- Development theory – Theories about how desirable change in society is best achieved
- Discourse on Colonialism – Essay by Aimé Césaire
- Ethnocide – Extermination of ethnic identities
- Faccetta nera – Italian Fascist-era marching song
- French law on colonialism – 2005 act by the French National Assembly
- Forced assimilation – Involuntary cultural assimilation of minority groups
- Indoctrination – Inculcating ideas in a person
- Lusotropicalism – Historical concept of Portuguese suitability as a coloniser
- Macaulayism – Education policy introduced in British colonies
- Manifest destiny – 19th-century expansionist belief in the U.S.
- Postcolonial amnesia
- Progressorship – Science fiction trope
- Western education – Education from the Western world
- White savior – Sarcastic or critical description
- The White Man's Burden – Poem by the English poet Rudyard Kipling
