= Luso-Africans =

Mestiço people in Africa who speak Portuguese

Luso-Africans are people of mixed Portuguese and African ancestry who speak Portuguese. The vast majority of Luso-Africans live in former Portuguese Africa, now referred to as Lusophone Africa, comprising the modern countries of Angola, Guinea-Bissau, Cape Verde, Mozambique, São Tomé and Príncipe, and Equatorial Guinea. A sizable number of Luso-Africans have also settled in Portugal where they form a racial minority. This ethnic identity arose from the sixteenth century as primarily male Portuguese settlers, often Lançados, settled in various parts of Africa, often marrying African women.

In the fifteenth and sixteenth century, Portuguese traders settled in Cape Verde and along the West African coast from Senegal to Sierra Leone. Descendants of these traders and of local African women formed the nucleus of a Luso-African community that soon developed a distinctive culture, joining elements of European and local African culture. These Luso-Africans, or "Portuguese" as they called themselves, were commercial middlemen, distinguished by their language (Portuguese and later Crioulo), architecture, and Christian religion. As each of these characteristics could be shared by members of adjacent African communities, identity transformations in both directions were relatively common. "Portuguese" identity remained both fluid and contextually defined through the seventeenth century. During the eighteenth and nineteenth centuries, however, 'Portuguese' were drawn increasingly into a European discourse on identity, one based upon a priori characteristics, primarily skin color. Forced to respond to this imposed identity, Luso-Africans continued to maintain that they were "Portuguese"; however, they also began to define themselves negatively by reference to what they were not.

== See also ==
- African Portuguese
- Assimilados
- Degredados
- Prazeros
- Lançados
- Lusotropicalismo
- Mestiço
- Órfãs do Rei
- Retornados
- Signares

== Bibliography ==
- Gilbert, E. & Reynolds, J.T. (2008). Africa in World History: From Prehistory to the Present. New Jersey: Pearson Prentice Hall.
