= List of former transcontinental countries =

This is a list of transcontinental former countries, i.e. countries which covered land on two or more continents, including islands associated with a continent other than the one where the country was based. The examples below are listed in chronological order with the number of continents covered in parentheses and the country's primary continent listed first. When a timespan is included, it is the time period in which the country was transcontinental.

== BCE ==
- Ancient Egyptian Empire (2) – Africa, Asia,
  - Hyksos (2) – Asia, Africa (circa 1648–1540 BC)
  - Kingdom of Kush (2) – Africa, Asia (occupied portions of Edom and Judah circa 901 BC)
- Sabaeans (2) – Asia, Africa
- Cimmerians (2) – Europe, Asia (late 8th century BC) ^{[map]}
- Assyria (2) – Asia, Africa (671–612 BC) ^{[map]}
- Neo-Babylonian Empire (2) – Asia, Africa (567–539 BC)
- Achaemenid Empire (3) – Asia, Europe, Africa ^{[map]}
- Carthage (2) – Africa, Europe
- Alexander the Great (3) – Europe, Asia, Africa (334–323 BC) ^{[map]}
- Ptolemaic Kingdom (3) – Africa, Asia, ^{[map]} Europe (at its peak) ^{[map]}
- Lysimachian Kingdom (2) – Europe, Asia (306–281 BC) ^{[map]}
- Seleucid Empire (2) – Asia, Europe (281 BC ^{[map]} and 196–191 BC ^{[map]})
- Roman Empire (3) – Europe, Asia, Africa ^{[map]}

== CE 1–CE 500 ==
- Sarmatians (2) – Europe, Asia ^{[map]}
- Kingdom of Aksum (2) – Africa, Asia^{[map]}
- Himyarite Kingdom (2) – Asia, Africa
- Palmyrene Empire (2) – Asia, Africa (260–273)
- Hunnic Empire (2) – Europe, Asia ^{[map]}
- Byzantine Empire (3) – Europe, Asia, Africa ^{[map]}
- Western Roman Empire (2) – Europe, Africa (395–476) ^{[map]}
- Vandal Kingdom (2) – Europe, Africa ^{[map]}
- Ostrogoths (2) – Europe, Africa

== 500–1000 ==
- Sabirs (2) – Europe, Asia
- Sassanid Empire (2) – Asia, Africa, (618–641) ^{[map]}
- First Turkic Khaganate (2) – Asia, Europe
- Islamic Caliphate
  - Rashidun Caliphate (2) – Asia, Africa (639–661) ^{[map]}
  - Umayyad Caliphate (3) – Asia, Africa, Europe (661–750) ^{[map]}
  - Abbasid Caliphate (3) – Asia, Africa, Europe (750–940)
- Alanian Empire (2) – Europe, Asia ^{[map]}
- Khazar Empire (2) – Europe, Asia
- Emirate of Córdoba (2) – Europe, Africa
- Pechenegs (2) – Europe, Asia ^{[map]}
- Shailendra dynasty (2) – Asia, Oceania
- Kingdom of Kakheti (2) – Asia, Europe
- Kingdom of Abkhazia (2) – Asia, Europe
- Aghlabid Emirate (2) – Africa, Europe (827–909)
- Tulunid Emirate (2) – Africa, Asia (877–904) ^{[map]}
- Sajid Emirate of Azerbaijan (2) – Asia, Europe
- Fatimid Caliphate (3) – Africa, Asia, ^{[map]} Europe ^{[map]}
- Rus (2) – Europe, Asia (at its peak during the Caspian expedition of 913) ^{[map]}
- Caliphate of Córdoba (2) – Europe, Africa
- Ikhshidids (2) – Africa, Asia (935–969) ^{[map]}

== 1000–1450 ==
- Sallarid Emirate of Azerbaijan (2) – Asia, Europe
- Kalbid Emirate of Sicily (2) – Europe, Africa
- Georgian Empire (2) – Asia, Europe ^{[map]}
- Almoravid Empire (2) – Africa, Europe ^{[map]}
- Seljuqs (2) – Asia, Europe ^{[map]}
- Pisa (3) – Europe, Asia, Africa ^{[map]}
- Kediri Empire (2) – Asia, Oceania ^{[map]}
- Chola Empire (2) – Asia, Oceania (at its peak circa 1050) ^{[map]}
- Kingdom of Sicily (2) – Europe, Africa
- Almohad Empire (2) – Africa, Europe
- Kingdom of Jerusalem (2) – Asia, Africa (1164 and 1167) ^{[map]}
- Ayyubid Sultanate (2) – Asia, Africa (1169–1250) ^{[map]}
- Shirvanshah Empire (2) – Asia, Europe
- Latin Empire (2) – Europe, Asia (1204–1261) ^{[map]}
- Venice (2) – Europe, Asia ^{[map]}
- Second Bulgarian Empire (2) – Europe, Asia (at its peak) ^{[map]}
- Khwarezmian Empire (2) – Asia, Europe (at its peak)
- Mongol Empire (2) – Asia, Europe ^{[map]} (largest empire of contiguous land area)
- Golden Horde (2) – Europe, Asia ^{[map]}
- Empire of Nicaea (2) – Asia, Europe ^{[map]}
- Mamluk Empire (2) – Africa, Asia
- Majapahit Empire (2) – Asia, Oceania ^{[map]}
- Ilkhanate (2) – Asia, Europe (1255–1335)
- Genoese Empire (2) – Europe, Asia^{[map]}
- Aragonese Empire (2) – Europe, Africa ^{[map]}^{[map]}
- Marinid Sultanate (2) – Africa, Europe (1294–1344) ^{[map]}
- Ottoman Empire (3) – Asia, Europe, Africa ^{[map]}
- Buginese Empire (2) – Oceania (including northern Australia), Asia
- Timurid Empire (2) – Asia, Europe
- Nogai Horde Empire (2) – Asia, Europe
- Castilian Empire (2) – Europe, Africa ^{[map]}
- Kara Koyunlu Empire (2) – Asia, Europe ^{[map]}
- Kingdom of Norway (872–1397) (2) – Europe, North America ^{[map]}

== 1450–1700 ==
- Portuguese Empire (6) – Europe, Asia, Africa, North America, South America, Oceania ^{[map]}^{[map]} (from 1808 to 1821, its capital was in Rio de Janeiro)
- Mahra Sultanate (2) – Asia, Africa ^{[map]}
- Spanish Empire (6) – Europe, Asia, Africa, North America, South America, Oceania ^{[map]}
- Kingdom of Denmark-Norway (4) – Europe, Asia, North America, Africa ^{[map]}
- German Empire (4) – Europe, South America, ^{[map]} Asia, ^{[map]} Africa ^{[map]}
- Guna people (2) – North America, South America (the Guna people were living in what is now Northern Colombia and the Darién Province of Panama, including the Darién Gap (the border between North and South America), at the time of the Spanish invasion in the early 1500s)
- Iberian Union Empire (6) – Europe, Asia, Africa, North America, South America, Oceania (1580–1640) ^{[map]}
- British Empire (6) – Europe, Asia, Africa, North America, South America, Oceania. ^{[map]}
- Dutch Empire (6) – Europe, Asia, Africa, North America, South America, Oceania ^{[map]}
- French Empire (6) – Europe, Asia, Africa, North America, South America, Oceania ^{[map]}
- Scotland (2) – Europe, North America (1621–1631) ^{[map]}
- Swedish Empire (3) – Europe, North America, ^{[map]} ^{[map]} Africa ^{[map]}
- Courland (3) – Europe, Africa, South America (1651–1689) (a dependency of Poland–Lithuania) ^{[map]}
- Knights of Malta (3) – Europe, Africa, North America (1530–1551 and 1651–1665)
- Brandenburg-Prussia (3) – Europe, Africa, ^{[map]}^{[map]} North America ^{[map]} (1682–1721)

== Since 1700 ==
- British Empire (7) – (English Empire until 1707) Asia, Oceania, Africa, Europe, South America, North America, Antarctica
- Omani Empire (2) – Asia, Africa (from 1840 to 1856, Said bin Sultan had the capital in Stone Town, Zanzibar)
- Kingdom of Piedmont-Sardinia (2) – Europe, Africa (1714–1718)
- Russian Empire (3) – Europe, Asia, North America ^{[map]}
- United States of America (5) – North America, Africa (1810–1814), ^{[map]} Asia (1898-1945), Oceania, South America (1898–1979) ^{[map]}^{[map]}
- Argentina (2) – South America, Antarctica
- Mexico (2) - North America, Oceania
- Chile (3) - South America, Antarctica, Oceania
- Ecuador (2) - South America, Oceania
- Portugal (5) - Europe, South America, Africa, Asia, Oceania
- Kingdom of the Two Sicilies (2) – Europe, Africa (1816–1860) ^{[map]}
- Kingdom of Italy (2) – Europe, Africa (1861–1889)^{[map]}
- German Empire (4) – Europe, Africa, Oceania, Asia (1884–1919) ^{[map]}
- Belgium (2) – Europe, Africa (1908–1962) ^{[map]}
- Denmark (4) – Europe, North America, Asia, Africa ^{[map]}
- Japanese Empire (3) – Asia, Oceania (1898–1945), North America (1943) ^{[map]}^{[map]}
- Norway (2) – Europe, Antarctica ^{[map]}
- France (7) – Europe, Africa, Asia, North America, South America, Oceania, Antarctica (1830–1962)
- Commonwealth of Australia (3) – Oceania, Asia, Antarctica^{[map]}
- Union of South Africa (1948–1961) and Republic of South Africa (2) – Africa, Antarctica (if the Prince Edward Islands are considered Antarctic islands)
- United Kingdom of Portugal, Brazil and the Algarves (5) – Europe, South America, Africa, Asia, Oceania
- Uzbek Khanate (2) – Asia, Europe
- Ak Koyunlu Empire (2) – Asia, Europe ^{[map]}
- Khanate of Sibir (2) – Asia, Europe ^{[map]}
- Astrakhan Khanate (2) – Europe, Asia
- Safavid Empire (2) – Asia, Europe^{[map]}
- Crimean Khanate (2) – Europe, Asia (at its peak)
- Grand Duchy of Moscow ^{[map]} and Tsardom of Russia (2) – Europe, Asia
- Kalmyk Khanate (2) – Asia, Europe^{[map]}
- Kingdom of Bali (2) – Asia, Oceania ^{[map]}
- Afsharid Empire (2) – Asia, Europe (1736–1747)
- Kazakh Khanate (2) – Asia, Europe
- Quba Khanate (2) – Europe, Asia (1747–1806)
- Kingdom of Kartl-Kakheti (2) – Asia, Europe (1762–1801)
- Qajar Empire (2) – Asia, Europe (1794–1813)^{[map]}
- Later Egyptian Empire (3) – Africa, Asia, Europe (1803–1807 and 1833–1882) ^{[map]}

== See also ==
- List of medieval great powers
- List of Bronze Age states
- List of Classical Age states
- List of former sovereign states
- List of empires
- List of Iron Age states
- List of former monarchies
- List of largest empires
- List of states during Late Antiquity
- Middle Eastern empires
