= Prazeiros (ethnic group) =

The Prazeiros were the Portuguese and Afro-Portuguese landowners who ruled, in a feudal-like manner, vast estates called prazos that were leased to them by the Portuguese Crown, in the Zambezi Valley from the sixteenth through to the eighteenth century. As a racially hybrid community, the Prazeiros signified not only a merger of cultures, but an emergence of a new socio-political order.

== The Zambezi valley ==
The Zambezi valley became a topic of interest to the Portuguese as early as 1505, and later became the main trading initiative taken by the prazeiros and their armies. By the mid-16th century, the Portuguese crown had established minuscule administration centres, which in turn prompted a small but sustainable migration pattern from Portugal to the valley.

By the next century, the Portuguese government grew weary in the status of the Zambezi Valley. With no formation of a well-trained administration bureaucracy, and a military that was small in numbers and underdeveloped in both military tactics and combat training, the region had no hope of effectively integrating into the colonial empire of the Portuguese.

== Establishment of the Prazeiro community ==
The first influx of Portuguese migration to the Zambezi Valley (beginning in the sixteenth century) consisted of prestigious Portuguese individuals and families, many of whom were awarded with estates as recognition for social standing, along with royal agents to the crown who had performed elite tasks on its behalf. Such individuals included priests, merchants, and military officers, who enjoyed a monopoly of power, wealth and prestige; all of whom were profoundly committed to the king and nation, and regarded themselves as representatives sent to expand the majesty of Portugal.

At this time, the number of people immigrating to the Zambezi Valley was minimal, due to the harsh weather conditions such as intense heat, prolonged rainfall and fatal diseases that characterized this region. In many ways, the Portuguese had to fight to survive. Due to the absence of a substantial population of eligible European women, Portuguese men were led to engage in interracial marriages and ultimately reproduce with the indigenous population, causing an upheaval in social and racial composition.

=== Increase in migration throughout the 18th Century ===
Throughout the 18th century, the Portuguese population in the Zambezi Valley continued to form unions with the local peoples, which also involved an adoption of culture, ultimately creating a hybrid race. By the middle of the 18th century, people of colour dominated the Prazeiro community; referred to as Muzungu, the offspring of Portuguese and African unions dominated the prazos, signifying a completion in racial absorption. As one of the first dominant hybrid cultures to exist in this region, the Prazeiros were successful in wielding tangible power in relations with the Europeans and the local indigenous population, acting as the “middle men” in numerous interactions.

== Power of the Prazeiros ==
As a community powerful in both numbers and in military/economic support, the main source of power for the Prazeiros were their large Chikunda armies which consisted primarily of captured slaves. These armies were utilized for the purposes of collecting taxes, hunting, raiding and trading with other local communities.

=== Chikunda Armies ===
The power of these armies through their abundant supply of guns and advanced weaponry eliminated any possibility of another large state opposing them. As a result, the Prazeiros dominated the ivory trade in the lower Zambezi Valley throughout the 18th century, shooting elephants without regard of local hunting laws, and continued raiding villages for captives to add to their armies.

Through the support of these armies, the Prazeiros controlled the people and the land of this region. Local farmers were taxed and expected to provide sufficient amounts of food to support the Prazeiro communities and their armies. Between 1630 and 1670, the Prazeiros invoked a deep sense of violence and oppression throughout the land, driving the local people to flee from their homes in hopes of refuge with local powerful men.

== The Prazeiros as trans-frontiersmen ==
Through this deep connection to indigenous African culture that was being transmitted through genealogical ties, the Prazeiros were in many ways Africanized, leading them to stray farther away from the Portuguese crown as time went on. From once recognizing themselves as agents for the crown, by the 18th century, the Prazeiros were no longer accepting of their subordinate position in society.

This non-conforming attitude led them to refuse to pay taxes or provide military assistance to the Portuguese nobility, while also rejecting the Portuguese appeal to renounce autonomy. Despite this appeal being enforced by their standing military power, the Prazeiros fought against them, proving their solidarity with their African home and people.

As trans-frontiersmen, the Prazeiros abided by four concepts: they were permanent residents on land extended beyond the European settler community’s limits; most marital unions they engaged in were with people from the indigenous population, rather than European; by adopting the culture and identity of the locals, all European ties amongst them were lost; their loyalty, despite originating with Portugal, shifted to the local people.

== Notable Prazeiros ==
- Manuel Antonio de Sousa
- João Bonifacio Alves da Silva

== See also ==
- Lançados
- Luso-Africans
- Degredados
- Bandeirantes
