= Mestiço =

Mixed indigenous and European

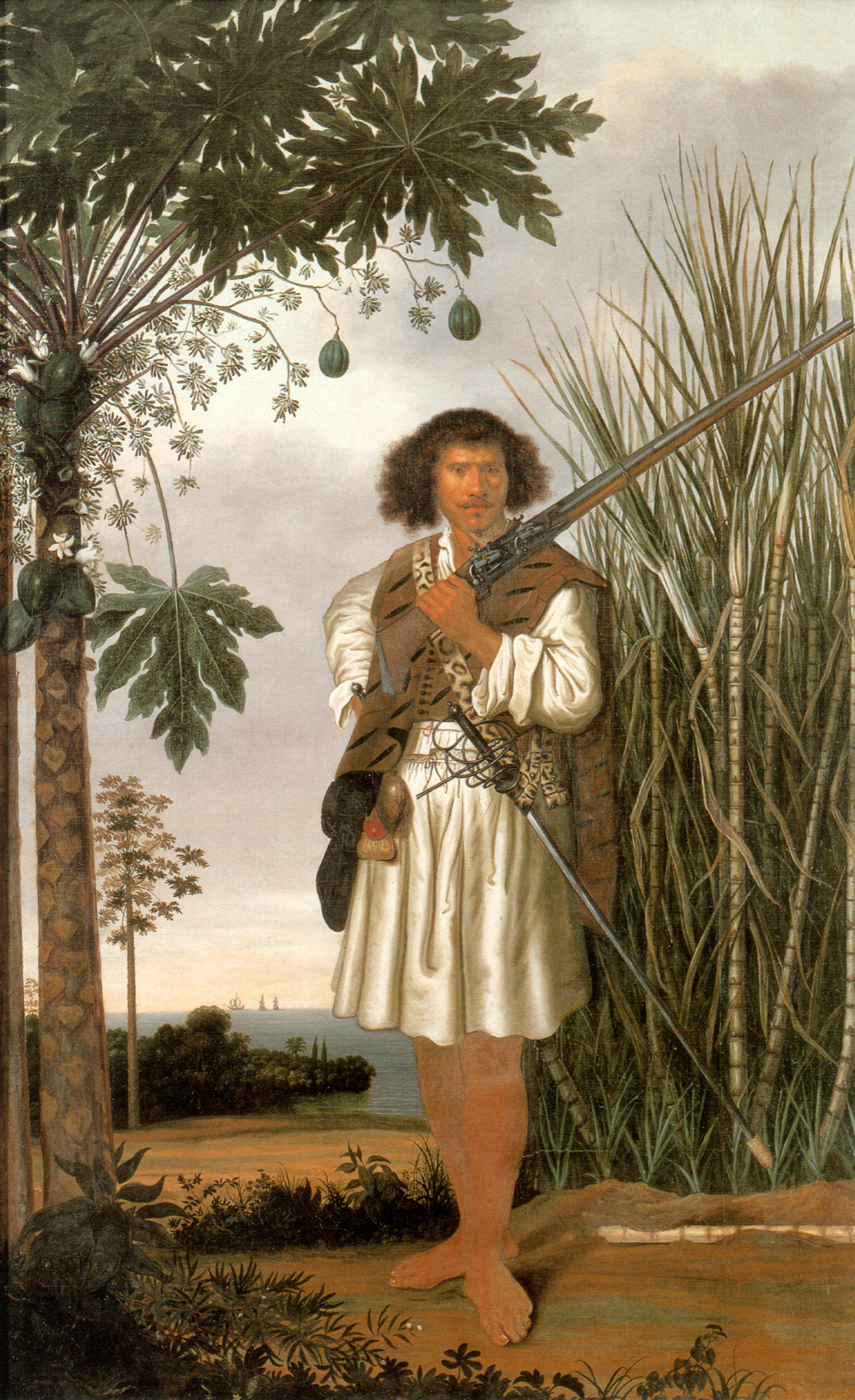
Mestiço man with gun and sword under a fruiting papaya tree, Albert Eckhout, mid-seventeenth century Dutch Brazil

Mestiço is a Portuguese term that refers to mixed-race people of European and Indigenous ancestry.

== Mestiço community in Brazil ==
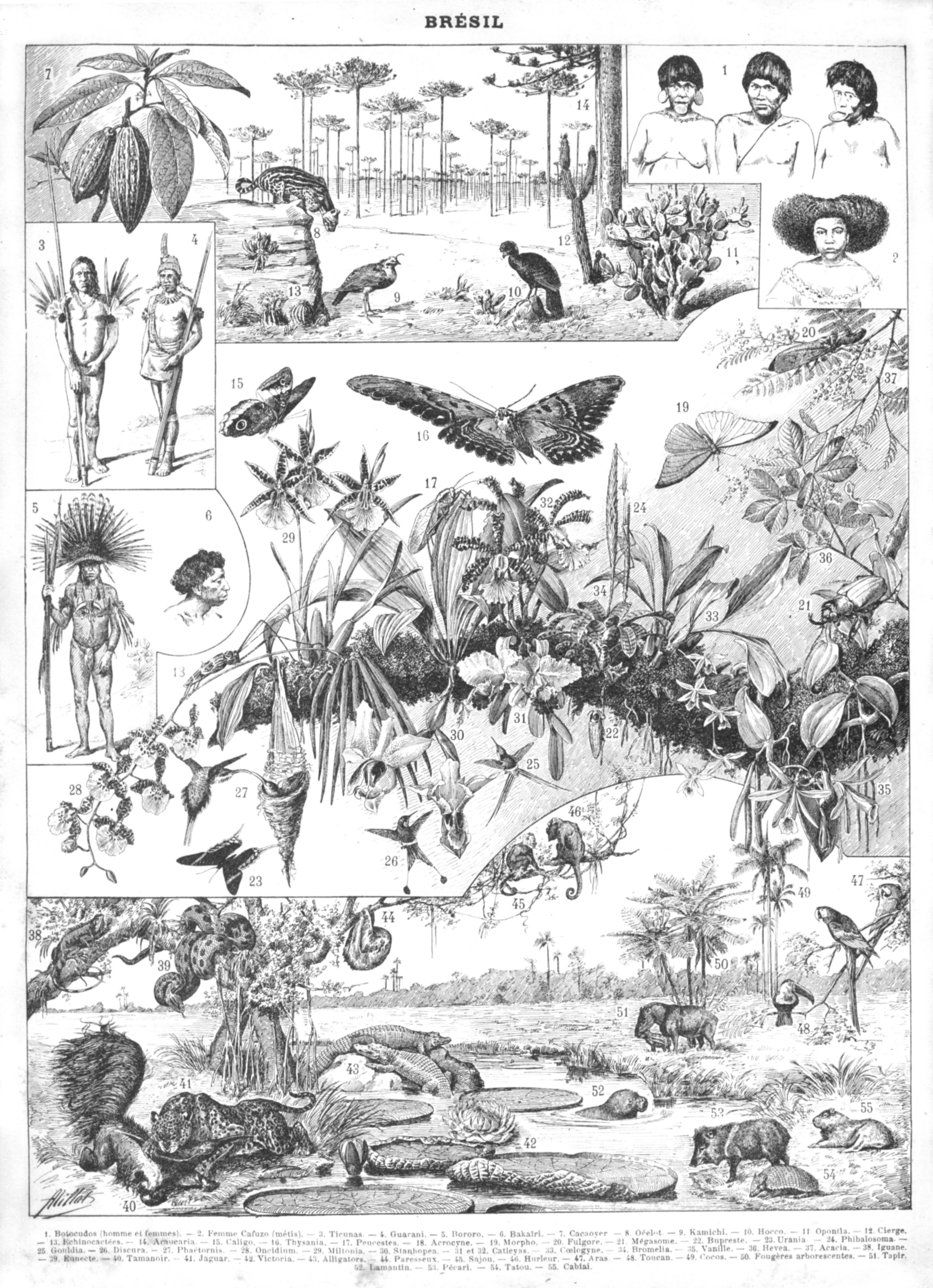
An image describing Brazil, at the end of the 19th century, by Nouveau Larousse illustré, in France: Indians, mestiços, examples of the fauna and flora of the country

In Colonial Brazil, it was initially used to refer to mamelucos, persons born from a couple in which one was an Indigenous American and the other a European. It literally translates as "mameluke", probably referring to the common Iberian comparisons of swarthy people to North Africans (cf. moreno, "tawny, swarthy, tanned" but also "dark colored" or "dark-haired human", from mouro, "Moor").

The term mameluco fell in disuse in Brazil and was replaced by the much more familiar-sounding caboclo (formerly caboco, from Tupi ka'abok, "the ones coming from the wilderness") or cariboca/curiboca (from kari'boka, "what comes from the white man"; could also mean the child of a caboclo and a white person, equivalent to the Spanish castizo, or to the child of a caboclo and an Indigenous person, equivalent to the Spanish cholo), given the fact that most Brazilians, even those living in ubiquitously Christian villages and towns, spoke Tupi and the Tupi-derived línguas gerais until the late 18th century, when they were banned by the Marquis of Pombal in 1777. A young Indigenous or caboclo boy would be a piá, from Tupi pyã, "heart", the way Indigenous mothers referred to their children. In modern-day Brazil (most particularly in the south), nevertheless, this word became general slang for any boy, regardless of race.

Even before the use of the Portuguese language in public became mandatory for Brazilians, nevertheless, other categories of mestiço appeared, with the introduction of African slavery by the Portuguese to Brazil and subsequent assimilation of them, whether enslaved, free or runaway, in both Portuguese settlements and Indigenous villages, as well as the Portuguese colonization of Africa and Asia.

A mulato (from muladi) was a person of simultaneous visible European and African descent. A cafuzo, cafuso, cafuz, carafuz, carafuzo, cafúzio, cabo-verde, caburé or caboré (the last three from Tupi caá-poré, "forest dweller") was a person of Amerindian and African descent, with jíbaro being someone who was a quarter Amerindian and three quarters African, and a juçara would be a visibly tri-racial person of mixed African, European and Amerindian descent (from Tupi yi'sara, "palm tree", "thorny one(s)", possibly by comparison of their phenotype with açaí berries, produced by the juçara palm tree). Any person of mixed African descent could be referred to as cabrocha (lit. "young, small goat"; with cabra, "goat", being a common synonym of man in Brazilian Portuguese, particularly in the northeast), which initially referred to a young child of a black and a white person.

In Brazil, the word mestiço was substituted for "pardo" in the 1890 census, alongside "caboclo" (brown), but then returned to "pardo" in subsequent censuses.

Pardo, the Portuguese word for a light brown color ("the color of a leopard", particularly in the context of complexion), evolved to mean any visibly mixed-race person that would not pass for any other race, to the exception of those of lighter complexion, who could be morenos (if dark-haired) or sararás (if light-haired, from Tupi sara-ra, "red-haired"; nevertheless, sarará evolved to mean only those of African descent more recently).

The term was and is used to describe individuals born from any mixture of different ethnicities. Mainly these individuals usually have a blend in African, Native American, and European, but other terms are used for specific groups. For example: European/Portuguese and Native American parents are commonly known as caboclo or, more commonly in the past, mameluco; individuals of European and African ancestry are described as mulato; cafuzos (known as zambo in the English language) are the production of Native American and African ancestors; and if someone has a mix of all three they are known as "pardo". Brazil celebrates The Mixed Race Day (Dia do Mestiço) (June 27 is an official date in States of Amazonas) to celebrate racial unity in the nation, Paraíba and Roraima. The Day of the Caboclo (Dia do Caboclo) occurs June 24.

== Mestiço community in Africa ==
=== Mestiço community in Angola ===
The Mestiço are primarily of mixed European, native born indigenous Angolan and/or other indigenous African lineages. They tend to be Portuguese culturally and to have full Portuguese names.

Although they make up about 2% of the population, they are the socially elite and racially privileged group in the country. Historically, Mestiços formed social and cultural allegiances with Portuguese colonists, subsequently identifying with the Portuguese over and above their indigenous identities. Despite their loyalty, the ethnic group faced economic and political adversity at hands of the white population during times of economic hardship for whites. These actions lead to ostracizing Mestiços from their inherited economic benefits which sparked the group to take a new sociopolitical direction. However, since the 400 year Portuguese presence in the country, the ethnic group has retained their position of entitlement which is highly evident in the political, economic and cultural hierarchy in present-day Angola. Their phenotype range is broad with a number of members possessing physical characteristics that are close to others within the indigenous black non-mixed population.

=== Mestiço community of Mozambique ===
A minority of the population of Mozambique are of mixed Bantu and Portuguese heritage. According to the 2017 census there are 212,540 of Mestiços in Mozambique, making up 0.79% of the population.

=== Mestiço community in São Tomé and Príncipe ===
Mestiços of São Tomé and Príncipe are descendants of Portuguese colonists and African slaves brought to Portuguese São Tomé and Príncipe islands during the early years of settlement from modern Benin, Gabon, the Republic of the Congo, the Democratic Republic of the Congo, and Angola (these people also are known as filhos da terra or "children of the land").

== Mestiço community in Asia ==
=== Mestiço community in India and Sri Lanka ===
In Portugal's colonies in India from the seventeenth century, the term "castiço" came to be applied used for Portuguese persons born in India without any racial mixing, while "mestiço" applied to anyone with any European ancestor, however remote. The mestiço children of wealthy Portuguese men were often sent to Portugal to study. Sometimes they remained there and established families and at times were culturally similar to but often at loggerheads with the Roman Catholic Brahmin and Roman Catholic Kshatriya communities. Television presenter Catarina Furtado is also part Indian. In Portuguese Ceylon (Sri Lanka), the names Mestiços (Portuguese for "Mixed People") or Casados ("Married") were applied to people of mixed Portuguese and Sri Lankan (Sinhalese and Tamil) descent, starting in the 16th century. The locals who converted to Christianity but did not have any European blood were called, "indiacatos".

=== Mestiço communities in Macau ===
There is a small community in Macau called the Macanese, in which they are mixed with Portuguese and Cantonese descent.

=== Mestiço communities in Malaysia and Singapore ===
The Kristang (otherwise known as "Portuguese-Eurasians" or "Malacca Portuguese") or Serani are a creole ethnic group of people of predominantly mixed Portuguese and Malaccan descent, with substantial Dutch, British, Jewish, Malay, Chinese and Indian heritage. They are based in Malaysia and to some extent in Singapore.

=== Mestiço communities in East Timor ===
In East Timor, there is a minority of people with are half Timorese and Portuguese, they are primarily concentrated in the city of Dili.

=== Mestiço communities in Indonesia ===
In Indonesia, Portuguese descendants are commonly found in the Eastern part of the country, particularly the Moluccas, North Sulawesi, as well as the Indonesian side of the Timor Island. Significant communities can also be found in Aceh and Jakarta.

== See also ==
- Lusotropicalismo
- Luso-Africans
- Lançados
- Indo-Portuguese
- Luso-Indians
- Luso-Asians
- Cape Verdeans
