= Órfãs d'El-Rei =

Female Portuguese orphans married off to Portuguese colonial settlers

The Órfãs d'El-Rei (Portuguese: [ˈɔɾfɐ̃ʒ dɛlˈʁej], lit. 'orphans of the king') were Portuguese girl orphans who were sent from Portugal to overseas colonies during the Portuguese Empire as part of Portugal's colonization efforts. The orphans were married to native rulers or Portuguese settlers.

== Purpose and practicalities ==
Órfãs d'El-Rei translates to "Orphans of the King", and they were all girls. Their fathers were Portuguese men who died in battle for the king. They were sent to the colonies of the Portuguese Empire. Bernard Sta Maria wrote that "From 1545, King John III began to send to India (and the Far East) with all pomp and distinction many young Portuguese women known as 'Orphans of the Queen' to be married with local young men." Both noble and non-noble girls were in the Órfãs d'El-Rei.

Since these girls were specifically designated as the "King's", the Portuguese government paid for their care and upbringing before and after they were sent to Portuguese India. Most of the girls were sent to the colony of Brazil, while relatively few were sent to Asian colonies such as Goa and Malacca. The "Shelter of the Castle" was one of the organizations which arranged for the Órfãs d'El-Rei to be sent overseas. The age limits were 12–30 years of age.

They departed from Lisbon and other Portuguese cities. Incentives such as dowries were given with the girls to potential husbands. For example, 1,000 xerafins were added to the dowry by Conde de Redondo in order to attract suitors for the orphans. Female orphans born in India did not have the same privileges as the Órfãs d'El-Rei. The dowries consisted of official positions or land.

== Geographical and numerical extent ==
The first contingent left Lisbon in 1545 and the system apparently continued to function intermittently until the eighteenth century. Regarding the timespan of the Órfãs d'El-Rei being sent overseas, it was said that "the system apparently continued to function intermittently until the (early) eighteenth century."

In particular, extensive boatloads of girls and their dowries were sent by Queen Catarina de Austria. During the Iberian Union, the Habsburg King of Portugal continued the policy of sending female orphans to Goa, ignoring protests from the Portuguese authorities there. Being "white, Catholic, and of good birth" were the requirements for a girl to become an Órfã d'El-Rei. The reason that the authorities protested against the King sending the órfãs to India was the lack of husbands. A proponent of the continued shipment of Portuguese girls to India was Fr. Álvaro Penteado. One of the aims of shipping the órfãs was to stop Portuguese men from marrying women of other races and provide them with Portuguese wives. The prevention of mixed-marriage would have resulted in a greater amount of white Portuguese. The sex ratio between men and women in Goa was skewed, and the shipments of Órfãs d'El-Rei was an attempt to correct this.

== Views of historians ==
Frederick Charles Danvers wrote in 1894 that "It had for some time been customary to send out orphan girls to India, from orphanages at Lisbon, with the view of getting them husbands and so providing for them, and, at the same time, with the view of furnishing wives of their own nation to the Portuguese in India, to prevent them from marrying native Indian women. In many instances these orphans were also provided with dowries by the State, which occasionally took the form of appointments in the Government service, which, though given to the girls themselves, were of course intended to be filled by their husbands. Appointments were similarly given to the daughters of Indian officials on their marriage, in consideration of the good services rendered to the State by their respective parents; in one case this dowry took the form of the appointment of Governor of Cranganor."

Afonso de Albuquerque also brought in Portuguese orphan girls to Portuguese Malacca in order to colonize the area.

One tale related how some Dutch privateers seized a ship with Portuguese orphan girls and took them as brides. James Talboys Wheeler wrote in 1881 that "It was the custom of the king of Portugal to send a number of well-born orphan girls every year to Goa, with sufficient dowries to procure them husbands in Portuguese India. Donna Lucia was one of three Portuguese orphan girls of good family who had been sent to India the previous year. The fleet which carried them was attacked by the Dutch, who captured some of the ships, and carried off the three damsels to Surat. Being passably handsome, most eminent merchants in Surat were anxious to marry them. All three became Protestants, and were provided with Protestant husbands. Two had gone off with their husbands to Java or elsewhere, but Donna Lucia had married the wealthiest Dutchman at Surat and remained there. Delia Valle found, however, to his great joy, that Donna Lucia was only a Protestant in name. She had been obliged to conform publicly to the Protestant "heresy", but was a Catholic in private, with the knowledge and connivance of her Protestant husband".

== Contemporary accounts ==
François Pyrard of Laval in his account of his voyages, observed some Portuguese merchants, when their ship was in danger, "It was a very miracle that saved us, for the wind was from the sea, and we were so close ashore that we had great difficulty in doubling the point and getting out. I believe more than 1,500 crowns' worth of vows were made, which were afterwards duly paid. The principal merchant made one of 800 cruzados: to wit, 400 for an orphan girl to marry withal, and 400 for a lamp and other utensils for a shrine of Our Lady that is hard by. As soon as he set foot on land he sought out an orphan girl, and fulfilled his promise to her, as also to the churchwardens of the said church. Many others, too, did the like; nor did any fail therein, according to his means and the extent of his vows. It is a custom of the Portuguese, when they are in peril, to make these vows; but the worst of it is that it makes them indolent and careless about working stoutly to save their lives."

== Native rulers ==
Some Órfãs d'El-Rei married native rulers who were either in exile or allied to the Portuguese.

The exiled former ruler (liwali) of Pemba converted to Christianity from Islam and was married to an órfã do rei named Dona Anna de Sepulveda in 1607. He also changed his name to Felipe da Gama, Dom Filipe, or Philip. However, he later reverted to Islam. A son, Estevão was born of their marriage. He was exiled from Pemba to Mombasa in 1596.

In the 1500s the exiled ruler of the Maldives, Hassan converted to Christianity and also married a Portuguese orphan. Her name was D. Francisca de Vasconcelos. The Portuguese girls also in Goa married native high caste Christians.

One of the Portuguese orphans kidnapped by the Dutch privateer ended up in Akbar the Great's harem.

== See also ==
- King's Daughters
- Casquette girl
- Lançados
